= 2023 Valour FC season =

Valour FC
2023 season
- President: Wade Miller
- Head coach: Phillip Dos Santos
- Stadium: IG Field
- Canadian Premier League: 8th
- Canadian Championship: Preliminary round
- Highest home attendance: 4,036
- Lowest home attendance: 2,665
- Average home league attendance: 3,220

The 2023 Valour FC season was the fifth season in the history of Valour FC. They played in the Canadian Premier League, which it co-founded and played in since the inception of both the club and the league. The club entered the Canadian Championship in the preliminary round.

== Background ==
In Valour's preceding four seasons, it never reached the play-offs, for which the top-four qualified in those seasons. The club ended in sixth place in the first two seasons and fifth place in the 2021 and 2022 seasons, missing the play-offs by one and nine points, respectively. The club's entry in the domestic cup competition, led to a single win over its previous four seasons. It was the club's second full season with Phillip Dos Santos as head coach, since he took over midway through the 2021 campaign.

== Current squad ==
As of August 17, 2023.

No.	Name	Nationality	Position(s)	Date of birth (age)	Previous club
Goalkeepers
1	Darlington Murasiranwa	(Zimbabwe)	GK	February 7, 2001 (aged 22)	(Canada) FC London
99	Rayane Yesli	(Algeria)	GK	October 12, 1999 (aged 24)	(Canada) Blainville
Defenders
2	Andy Baquero	(Cuba)	RB / RW	August 17, 1994 (aged 29)	(Dominican Republic) Delfines del Este
3	Jordan Haynes	(Canada)	LB / LW	January 17, 1996 (aged 27)	(Canada) Pacific FC
4	Guillaume Pianelli	(France)	CB	May 1, 1998 (aged 25)	(Canada) UQTR Patriotes
5	Abdou Samake	(Mali)	CB	October 7, 1996 (aged 27)	(Canada) Pacific FC
18	Klaidi Cela	(Canada)	CB	July 16, 1999 (aged 24)	(Canada) Vaughan Azzurri
19	Eskander Mzoughi	(Canada)	RB	February 6, 2003 (aged 20)	(Belgium) Oud-Heverlee Leuven U23
22	Matteo de Brienne	(Canada)	LB	May 22, 2002 (aged 21)	(Canada) Carleton University
35	Andrew Jean-Baptiste	(Haiti)	CB	June 16, 1992 (aged 31)	(Sweden) Umeå FC
	Matthew Chandler	(Canada)	CB	February 7, 2000 (aged 23)	(United States) Wisconsin Badgers
Midfielders
6	Dante Campbell	(Canada)	DM / CB	May 22, 1999 (aged 24)	(United States) LA Galaxy II
7	Kian Williams	(England)	AM / CF	January 7, 2000 (aged 23)	(Iceland) Keflavík
8	Diego Gutiérrez	(Canada)	RM / RB	February 18, 1997 (aged 26)	(Chile) Barnechea
10	Kevin Rendón	(Colombia)	AM	January 8, 1993 (aged 30)	(Colombia) Deportivo Pasto
20	Juan Pablo Sanchez	(United States) / (Canada)	MF	April 18, 2003 (aged 20)	(Portugal) Salgueiros
21	Marcello Polisi	(Canada)	CM / DM	January 24, 1997 (aged 26)	(Canada) HFX Wanderers
27	Raphael Ohin	(Ghana)	CM	May 25, 1995 (aged 28)	(Canada) WSA Winnipeg
Forwards
9	Walter Ponce	(Chile)	CF	March 4, 1998 (aged 25)	(Chile) Barnechea
11	Jared Ulloa	(Peru)	RW / LW	June 8, 2002 (aged 21)	(Peru) Sporting Cristal
12	Ahinga Selemani	(United States)	FW	March 15, 1996 (aged 27)	(United States) One Knoxville SC
23	Anthony Novak	(Canada)	ST	March 27, 1994 (aged 29)	(Canada) Cavalry FC
24	Pacifique Niyongabire	(Burundi)	LW / RW	March 15, 2000 (aged 23)	(Australia) Perth Glory
32	Jaime Siaj	(Jordan)	ST	December 16, 1995 (aged 28)	(Republic of Ireland) Finn Harps

== Transfers ==
=== In ===
==== Transferred in ====
No.	Pos.	Player	From club	Fee/notes	Date	Source
3	DF	(Canada) Jordan Haynes	(Canada) Pacific FC	Free	December 5, 2022	
5	DF	(Mali) Abdou Samake	(Canada) Pacific FC	Free	December 12, 2022	
24	FW	(Burundi) Pacifique Niyongabire	(Australia) Perth Glory	Free	December 19, 2022	
7	MF	(England) Kian Williams	(Iceland) Keflavík	Free	December 21, 2022	
21	MF	(Canada) Marcello Polisi	(Canada) HFX Wanderers	Free	January 4, 2023	
	DF	(Canada) Eskander Mzoughi	(Belgium) Oud-Heverlee Leuven	Free	January 18, 2023	
	MF	(United States) Juan Pablo Sanchez	(Portugal) Salgueiros	Free	January 18, 2023	
32	FW	(Jordan) Jaime Siaj	(Republic of Ireland) Finn Harps	Free	January 25, 2023	
11	MF	(Peru) Jared Ulloa	(Peru) Sporting Cristal	Free	February 2, 2023	
6	MF	(Canada) Dante Campbell	(United States) LA Galaxy II	Free	February 10, 2023	
1	GK	(Canada) Jordan Tisseur	(Canada) FC Laval	Signed to a development contract	February 20, 2023	
4	DF	(France) Guillaume Pianelli	(Canada) UQTR Patriotes	Selected 5th overall in the 2023 CPL–U Sports Draft	March 6, 2023	
23	FW	(Canada) Anthony Novak	(Canada) Cavalry FC	Free	March 9, 2023	
	DF	(Canada) Matthew Chandler	(United States) Wisconsin Badgers	Free	April 6, 2023	
	DF	(Canada) Klaidi Cela	(Canada) Vaughan Azzurri	Free	April 27, 2023	
12	FW	(United States) Ahinga Selemani	(United States) One Knoxville SC	Free	July 22, 2023	
	GK	(Zimbabwe) Darlington Murasiranwa	(Canada) FC London	Free	August 17, 2023	

==== Draft picks ====
Valour FC selected the following players in the 2023 CPL–U Sports Draft. Draft picks are not automatically signed to the team roster. Only those who are signed to a contract will be listed as transfers in.

Round	Selection	Pos.	Player	Nationality	University
1	5	DF	Guillaume Pianelli	France	UQTR
2	12	DF	Samuel LaPlante	Canada	UQTR

=== Out ===
==== Transferred out ====
No.	Pos.	Player	To club	Fee/notes	Date	Source
17	MF	(Canada) Brett Levis	(United States) FC Tulsa	Contract expired	November 15, 2022	
4	DF	(Lebanon) Tony Mikhael		Contract expired	November 15, 2022	
12	DF	(United States) Jonathan Esparza		Contract expired	November 15, 2022	
1	GK	(Canada) Jonathan Sirois	(Canada) CF Montréal	End of loan	November 30, 2022	
24	FW	(Canada) Sean Rea	(Canada) CF Montréal	End of loan	November 30, 2022	
13	FW	(Turks and Caicos Islands) Billy Forbes	(United States) Detroit City	End of loan	November 30, 2022	
14	DF	(Canada) Stefan Cebara		Contract expired	December 13, 2022	
11	MF	(Canada) Alessandro Riggi		Contract expired	December 13, 2022	
77	MF	(Trinidad and Tobago) Federico Peña	(Sweden) Umeå FC	Contract expired	December 13, 2022	
7	FW	(New Zealand) Moses Dyer	(United States) FC Tulsa	Contract expired	December 22, 2022	
3	DF	(Canada) Rocco Romeo	(Canada) Vancouver FC	Contract expired	January 16, 2023	
16	FW	(Northern Ireland) Daryl Fordyce	Retired		January 20, 2023	
5	DF	(Algeria) Nassim Mekideche	(United States) Sporting Kansas City II	Contract expired	January 23, 2023	
70	MF	(Canada) Matthew Catavolo	(Canada) Toronto FC II	Undisclosed fee	March 21, 2023	

== Pre-season and friendlies ==
=== Friendlies ===
Valour played three friendlies in as part of their preseason preparations.

Win Draw Loss Fixtures

March 18, 2023	Vancouver FC	2–2	Valour FC	Langley, British Columbia
	Hundal; Romeo		Siaj; Mat.Polisi	Stadium: Willoughby Community Park Stadium; Referee: Carly Shaw-MacLaren

March 22, 2023	Pacific FC	2–0	Valour FC	Langford, British Columbia
				Stadium: Starlight Stadium; Referee: Alain Ruch

April 3, 2023	Cavalry FC	0–2	Valour FC	Calgary, Alberta
		Report	Niyongabire	Stadium: Macron Performance Centre; Referee: Yusri Rudolf

== Competitions ==
Competition	First match	Last match	Starting round	Final position	Record							
Competition	First match	Last match	Starting round	Final position	Pld	W	D	L	GF	GA	GD	Win %
Canadian Premier League regular season	April 16, 2023	October 6, 2023	—	8th	28	6	8	14	25	38	−13	21.43
Canadian Championship	April 19, 2023	April 19, 2023	Preliminary round	Preliminary round	1	0	0	1	1	3	−2	0.00
Total					29	6	8	15	26	41	−15	20.69

Last updated: December 29, 2023
Source: Competitions

=== Canadian Premier League regular season ===
==== League table ====
Pos	Team	Pld	W	D	L	GF	GA	GD	Pts	Playoff qualification
1	Cavalry (S)	28	16	7	5	46	27	+19	55	First semifinal
2	Forge (C)	28	11	9	8	39	32	+7	42 (Note: Tie resolved by away goal differential; Forge: +4, Wanderers: −2)	First semifinal
3	HFX Wanderers	28	11	9	8	39	32	+7	42	Quarterfinal
4	Pacific	28	11	7	10	42	35	+7	40	Play-in round
5	York United	28	11	5	12	35	44	−9	38	Play-in round
6	Atlético Ottawa	28	10	6	12	38	34	+4	36	
7	Vancouver	28	8	5	15	28	50	−22	29	
8	Valour	28	6	8	14	25	38	−13	26	

Source: CanPL
Rules for classification: 1) Points; 2) Total wins; 3) Goal difference; 4) Goals scored; 5) Away goal differential; 6) Away goals scored; 7) Home goal differential; 8) Home goals scored; 9) Total minutes played by U-21 players; 10) Coin toss (2 teams tied) or drawing of lots (3+ teams tied).
(C) Champion (qualified to Champions Cup); (S) CPL Shield winner (qualified to Champions Cup)

==== Matches ====
Win Draw Loss Fixtures

April 16, 2023 1	York United	0–2	Valour FC	Toronto
	Gagnon-Laparé (yellow card) 16'; Ferrari (yellow card) 46'; Grant (yellow card) 66'; Wright (yellow card) 80'	Report	Ohin (yellow card) 25'; Baquero (yellow card) 31'; Grant 51' (o.g.); Novak 54'; Campbell (yellow card) 83'; Yesli (yellow card) 90+2'	Stadium: York Lions Stadium; Attendance: 1,607

April 22, 2023 2	Valour FC	1–1	Atlético Ottawa	Winnipeg
	Gutiérrez 3'; Novak (yellow card) 10'; Campbell (yellow card) 59'; Pianelli (yellow card) 81'	Report	dos Santos 32'; de la Concepción (yellow card) 68'; Salter (yellow card) 83'	Stadium: IG Field; Attendance: 3374

April 30, 2023 3	Cavalry FC	1–1	Valour FC	Foothills County
				Stadium: ATCO Field

May 6, 2023 4	Valour FC	0–0	HFX Wanderers	Winnipeg
				Stadium: IG Field

May 13, 2023 5	Forge FC	3–2	Valour FC	Hamilton
				Stadium: Tim Hortons Field

May 20, 2023 6	Valour FC	1–1	Pacific FC	Winnipeg
				Stadium: IG Field

May 28, 2023 7	Vancouver FC	0–0	Valour FC	Langley
				Stadium: Willoughby Community Park Stadium

June 4, 2023 8	Valour FC	1–1	York United	Winnipeg
				Stadium: IG Field

June 10, 2023 9	HFX Wanderers	2–0	Valour FC	Halifax
				Stadium: Wanderers Grounds

June 16, 2023 10	Valour FC	2–0	Forge FC	Winnipeg
				Stadium: IG Field

June 21, 2023 11	Pacific FC	1–0	Valour FC	Langford
				Stadium: Starlight Stadium

June 25, 2023 12	Valour FC	1–0	Vancouver FC	Winnipeg
				Stadium: IG Field

July 1, 2023 13	Valour FC	0–2	Cavalry FC	Winnipeg
				Stadium: IG Field

July 9, 2023 14	Atlético Ottawa	2–0	Valour FC	Ottawa
				Stadium: TD Place Stadium

July 15, 2023 15	Forge FC	1–1	Valour FC	Hamilton
				Stadium: Tim Hortons Field

July 23, 2023 16	Valour FC	1–2	York United	Winnipeg
				Stadium: IG Field

July 29, 2023 17	Valour FC	0–3	Pacific FC	Winnipeg
		Report	Reid 4'; Heard 82'; Sellouf 84'	Stadium: IG Field; Attendance: 2,977

August 6, 2023 18	Vancouver FC	0–0	Valour FC	Langley
				Stadium: Willoughby Community Park Stadium

August 11, 2023 19	Valour FC	3–2	Cavalry FC	Winnipeg
				Stadium: IG Field

August 18, 2023 20	Valour FC	1–3	Atlético Ottawa	Winnipeg
				Stadium: IG Field

August 26, 2023 21	HFX Wanderers	3–0	Valour FC	Halifax
				Stadium: Wanderers Grounds

September 2, 2023 22	Pacific FC	2–1	Valour FC	Langford
				Stadium: Starlight Stadium

September 8, 2023 23	York United	1–3	Valour FC	Toronto
				Stadium: York Lions Stadium

September 17, 2023 24	Valour FC	2–3	Forge FC	Winnipeg
				Stadium: IG Field

September 20, 2023 25	Valour FC	0–1	Vancouver FC	Winnipeg
				Stadium: IG Field

September 24, 2023 26	Atlético Ottawa	0–1	Valour FC	Ottawa
				Stadium: TD Place Stadium

September 29, 2023 27	Cavalry FC	2–1	Valour FC	Foothills County
				Stadium: ATCO Field

October 6, 2023 28	Valour FC	0–1	HFX Wanderers	Winnipeg
		Report		Stadium: IG Field; Attendance: 3,317

=== Canadian Championship ===
Win Draw Loss Fixtures

April 19, 2023 First round	TSS FC Rovers	3–1	Valour FC	Burnaby, British Columbia
	Polisi 39', 62'; Mejia 42'	Report	Novak 88' (pen.)	Stadium: Swangard Stadium
