= 2024 Valour FC season =

Valour FC
2024 season
- President: Wade Miller
- Head coach: Phillip Dos Santos
- Stadium: Princess Auto Stadium
- Canadian Premier League: 8th
- Canadian Championship: Preliminary round
Home colours	Away colours

The 2024 Valour FC season is the sixth season in the history of Valour FC. In addition to the Canadian Premier League, the club competed in the Canadian Championship.

== Current squad ==
As of August 6, 2024.

No.	Name	Nationality	Position(s)	Date of birth (age)	Previous club	Notes
Goalkeepers
1	Darlington Murasiranwa	(Zimbabwe)	GK	February 7, 2001 (aged 23)	(Canada) FC London	
50	Jonathan Viscosi	(Canada)	GK	March 18, 1991 (aged 33)	(Finland) VPS	
Defenders
2	Roberto Alarcón	(Spain)	RB	April 21, 1998 (aged 26)	(Canada) Cavalry FC	INT
3	Jordan Haynes	(Canada)	LB / LW	January 17, 1996 (aged 28)	(Canada) Pacific FC	
4	Charalampos Chantzopoulos	(Germany)	CB	July 8, 1994 (aged 30)	(Finland) KPV	INT
13	Tass Mourdoukoutas	(Australia)	CB	March 3, 1999 (aged 25)	(Canada) York United	INT
23	Gianfranco Facchineri	(Canada)	CB	April 27, 2002 (aged 22)	(Canada) Windsor City FC	U-S
30	Themi Antonoglou	(Canada)	LB / LW	June 2, 2001 (aged 23)	(Canada) Toronto FC	
Midfielders
6	Dante Campbell	(Canada)	DM / CB	May 22, 1999 (aged 25)	(United States) LA Galaxy II	
7	Kian Williams	(England)	AM / CF	January 7, 2000 (aged 24)	(Iceland) Keflavík	INT, IL
8	Juan Pablo Sanchez	(United States)	MF	April 18, 2003 (aged 21)	(Portugal) Salgueiros	U21
11	Noah Verhoeven	(Canada)	CM	June 15, 1999 (aged 25)	(Canada) Atlético Ottawa	Loan
17	Jordan Faria	(Canada)	CM	June 13, 2000 (aged 24)	(Canada) Toronto FC II	
20	Diogo Ressurreição	(Portugal)	MF	August 15, 2000 (aged 24)	(Portugal) Vitória Guimarães B	INT
21	Marcello Polisi	(Canada)	CM / DM	January 24, 1997 (aged 27)	(Canada) HFX Wanderers	
24	Zachary Sukunda	(Canada)	AM / RW / RB	June 24, 1995 (aged 29)	(Finland) IF Gnistan	
27	Raphael Ohin	(Ghana)	CM	May 25, 1995 (aged 29)	(Canada) WSA Winnipeg	
64	Safwane Mlah	(Canada)	AM	December 8, 2001 (aged 23)	(Canada) CS Saint-Laurent	
Forwards
9	Jordan Swibel	(Australia)	CF	April 13, 1999 (aged 25)	(Australia) Marconi Stallions	INT
10	Shaan Hundal	(Canada)	CF	July 14, 1999 (aged 25)	(Canada) Vancouver FC	
16	Joe Hanson	(Canada)	CF / AM	August 10, 2003 (aged 21)	(Canada) Whitecaps FC 2	U21
19	Abdul Binate	(Canada)	CF	January 24, 2003 (aged 21)	(Canada) Pacific FC	U21
25	Loïc Kwemi	(Canada)	CF	March 2, 1997 (aged 27)	(Canada) CS Saint-Laurent	

== Transfers ==
=== In ===
==== Transferred in ====
No.	Pos.	Player	From club	Fee/notes	Date	Source
	FW	(Canada) Shaan Hundal	(Canada) Vancouver FC	Free	December 1, 2023	
	MF	(Canada) Zachary Sukunda	(Finland) IF Gnistan	Free	December 1, 2023	
	DF	(Spain) Roberto Alarcón	(Canada) Cavalry FC	Free	December 15, 2023	
	MF	(Canada) Jordan Faria	(Canada) Toronto FC II	Free	December 18, 2023	
	DF	(Australia) Tass Mourdoukoutas	(Canada) York United	Free	December 27, 2023	
	FW	(Australia) Jordan Swibel	(Australia) Marconi Stallions	Free	January 12, 2024	
	DF	(Germany) Charalampos Chantzopoulos	(Finland) KPV	Free	January 25, 2024	
	DF	(Canada) Themi Antonoglou	(Canada) Toronto FC	Free	February 2, 2024	
	GK	(Canada) Jonathan Viscosi	(Finland) VPS	Free	February 9, 2024	
	FW	(Canada) Abdul Binate	(Canada) Pacific FC	Free	February 14, 2024	
	FW	(Canada) Joe Hanson	(Canada) Whitecaps FC 2	Free	April 8, 2024	
	MF	(Portugal) Diogo Ressurreição	(Portugal) Vitória Guimarães B	Free	April 10, 2024	
	DF	(Canada) Gianfranco Facchineri	(Canada) Windsor City FC	Selected 9th in the 2024 CPL–U Sports Draft, U-Sports contract	April 11, 2024	
	MF	(Canada) Safwane Mlah	(Canada) CS Saint-Laurent	Free	June 28, 2024	
	FW	(Canada) Loïc Kwemi	(Canada) CS Saint-Laurent	Free	June 28, 2024	

==== Loans in ====
No.	Pos.	Player	Loaned from	Fee/notes	Date	Source
	MF	(Canada) Noah Verhoeven	(Canada) Atlético Ottawa	Season-long loan	February 9, 2024	

==== Draft picks ====
Valour FC selected the following players in the 2024 CPL–U Sports Draft. Draft picks are not automatically signed to the team roster. Only those who are signed to a contract will be listed as transfers in.

Round	Selection	Pos.	Player	Nationality	University
1	1	MF	Owen Sheppard	Canada	Cape Breton
2	9	DF	Gianfranco Facchineri	Canada	Windsor

=== Out ===
==== Transferred out ====
No.	Pos.	Player	To club	Fee/notes	Date	Source
4	DF	(France) Guillaume Pianelli		Contract expired	December 31, 2023	
22	DF	(Canada) Matteo de Brienne	(Canada) Atlético Ottawa	Contract expired	December 31, 2023	
35	DF	(Haiti) Andrew Jean-Baptiste		Contract expired	December 31, 2023	
8	MF	(Canada) Diego Gutiérrez	(Canada) Cavalry FC	Contract expired	December 31, 2023	
9	FW	(Chile) Walter Ponce	(Chile) Unión La Calera	Contract expired	December 31, 2023	
	DF	(Canada) Matthew Chandler		Option declined	December 31, 2023	
19	DF	(Canada) Eskander Mzoughi	(Tunisia) AS Soliman	Option declined	December 31, 2023	
10	MF	(Colombia) Kevin Rendón	(Colombia) Deportivo Pasto	Option declined	December 31, 2023	
11	MF	(Peru) Jared Ulloa	(Peru) Unión Huaral	Option declined	December 31, 2023	
12	FW	(United States) Ahinga Selemani		Option declined	December 31, 2023	
23	FW	(Canada) Anthony Novak		Option declined	December 31, 2023	
32	FW	(Jordan) Jaime Siaj	(Kuwait) Khaitan SC	Option declined	December 31, 2023	
2	DF	(Cuba) Andy Baquero	(Canada) Vaughan Azzurri	Option declined	December 31, 2023	
18	DF	(Canada) Klaidi Cela	(Kosovo) KF Liria	Option declined	December 31, 2023	
24	FW	(Burundi) Pacifique Niyongabire	(United States) Tampa Bay Rowdies	Undisclosed fee	January 12, 2024	
99	GK	(Algeria) Rayane Yesli	(Canada) Atlético Ottawa	Undisclosed fee	February 9, 2024	
33	DF	(Mali) Abdou Samaké	(Gibraltar) Glacis United	Contract terminated by mutual consent	June 25, 2024	

== Competitions ==
=== Canadian Premier League regular season ===
==== League table ====
Pos	Team	Pld	W	D	L	GF	GA	GD	Pts	Playoff qualification
1	Forge (S)	28	15	5	8	45	31	+14	50	First semifinal
2	Cavalry (C)	28	12	12	4	39	27	+12	48	First semifinal
3	Atlético Ottawa	28	11	11	6	42	31	+11	44	Quarterfinal
4	York United	28	11	6	11	35	36	−1	39	Play-in round
5	Pacific	28	9	7	12	27	32	−5	34	Play-in round
6	HFX Wanderers	28	7	9	12	37	43	−6	30 (Note: Head-to-head points: HFX Wanderers 7, Vancouver 4)	
7	Vancouver	28	7	9	12	29	43	−14	30	
8	Valour	28	7	7	14	31	42	−11	28	

Source: CanPL
Rules for classification: 1) Points; 2) Total number of wins; 3) Head-to-head; 4) Goal differential; 5) Goals for; 6) Away goals differential; 7) Away goals for; 8) Home goals differential; 9) Home goals for; 10) Fewest disciplinary points; 11) Most under-21 domestic player minutes; 12) Drawing of lots.
(C) Champion (qualified to Champions Cup Round one); (S) CPL Shield winner (qualified to Champions Cup Round one)

==== Matches ====
Win Draw Loss Fixtures

April 14 1	Vancouver FC	4-1	Valour FC	Langley Township
	Dyer (yellow card) 31'; Dyer 45'; Gee 47'; Conroy (yellow card) 52'; Bitar 53'; Norman Jr. 67'; Cantave (yellow card) 79'	Report	Swibel 24'; Faria (yellow card) 48' (yellow-red card) 56'; Campbell (yellow card) 80'	Stadium: Willoughby Community Park; Attendance: 4038

April 19 2	Pacific FC	2–0	Valour FC	Langford
	Heard 47'; Heard (yellow card) 51'; Bahous (yellow card) 77'; Young 79'	Report	Facchineri (yellow card) 15'; Swibel (yellow card) 37'; Verhoeven (yellow card) 44'; Campbell (yellow card) 84'; Haynes (yellow card) 90+2'	Stadium: Starlight Stadium; Attendance: 2851

April 27 3	Forge FC	2–1	Valour FC	Hamilton
	Choinière (yellow card) 33'; Parra (yellow card) 42'; Borges 61'; Metusala (yellow card) 70'; Borges (yellow card) 76'; Jensen 90'; Jensen (yellow card) 90+1'	Report	Facchineri (yellow card) 45'; Faria 65'	Stadium: Tim Hortons Field; Attendance: 3051

May 5 4	Atlético Ottawa	2–0	Valour FC	Ottawa
	del Campo 19'; Antinoro 32'; Didić (yellow card) 47'; de Brienne (yellow card) 67'; Twardek (yellow card) 90+1'	Report	Verhoeven (yellow card) 18'; Campbell (yellow card) 70'; Faria (yellow card) 90+3'	Stadium: TD Place Stadium; Attendance: 3886

May 10 5	York United FC	3–1	Valour FC	Toronto
	Ferrari (yellow card) 11'; Babouli (yellow card) 45+3'; Abatneh 68'; Wright 74'; Sturing (yellow card) 82'; Babouli 90+1'; Botello (yellow card) 90+2'; Ricci (yellow card) 90+6'	Report	Campbell 15'; Sanchez (yellow card) 28'; Ressurreição (yellow card) 36'; Hanson (yellow card) 60'	Stadium: York Lions Stadium; Attendance: 1049

May 20 6	HFX Wanderers FC	1–2	Valour FC	Halifax
	Nimick 67' (pen.); Nimick (yellow card) 73'; Fernandez (yellow card) 87'	Report	Darlington Murasiranwa (yellow card) 15'; Verhoeven (yellow card) 43'; Ressurreição 49'; Sanchez (yellow card) 58'; Faria (yellow card) 59'; Dos Santos (yellow card) 67'; Antonoglou (yellow card) 74'; Swibel 75'	Stadium: Wanderers Grounds; Attendance: 6413

May 26 7	Cavalry FC	1–1	Valour FC	Foothills County
	Trafford (yellow card) 11'; Aird 39'	Report	Sanchez 31'; Binate (yellow card) 34'; Ohin (yellow card) 79'; Faria (yellow card) 88'	Stadium: ATCO Field; Attendance: 3395

June 2 8	Valour FC	2–0	Vancouver FC	Winnipeg
	Swibel 38'; Swibel 48'; Hundal (yellow card) 59'; Binate (yellow card) 89'; Sukunda (yellow card) 90+2'	Report	Fry (yellow card) 44'	Stadium: Princess Auto Stadium; Attendance: 4262

June 9 9	Valour FC	0–2	Atlético Ottawa	Winnipeg
	Ohin (yellow card) 55'; Verhoeven (yellow card) 58'; Alarcón (yellow card) 61'	Report	de Brienne (yellow card) 13'; Bassett 59' (pen.); Salter 9+1'	Stadium: Princess Auto Stadium; Attendance: 4750

June 14 10	Valour FC	2–3	Pacific FC	Winnipeg
				Stadium: Princess Auto Stadium

June 23 11	Forge FC	2–1	Valour FC	Hamilton
				Stadium: Tim Hortons Field

June 27 12	Valour FC	1–0	York United FC	Winnipeg
				Stadium: Princess Auto Stadium

July 7 13	Valour FC	0–1	Cavalry FC	Winnipeg
				Stadium: Princess Auto Stadium

July 18 14	HFX Wanderers FC	3–1	Valour FC	Halifax
				Stadium: Wanderers Grounds

July 21 15	Atlético Ottawa	2–2	Valour FC	Ottawa
				Stadium: TD Place Stadium

July 28 16	Pacific FC	0–3	Valour FC	Langford
				Stadium: Starlight Stadium

August 4 17	Valour FC	2–1	Forge FC	Winnipeg
				Stadium: Princess Auto Stadium

August 11 18	Valour FC	0–1	York United FC	Winnipeg
				Stadium: Princess Auto Stadium

August 17 19	Valour FC	2–1	HFX Wanderers FC	Winnipeg
				Stadium: Princess Auto Stadium

August 25 20	Valour FC	1–2	Vancouver FC	Winnipeg
				Stadium: Princess Auto Stadium

August 30 21	Cavalry FC	2–2	Valour FC	Foothills County
				Stadium: ATCO Field

September 9 22	Valour FC	1–1	Atlético Ottawa	Winnipeg
				Stadium: Princess Auto Stadium

September 13 23	York United FC	1–1	Valour FC	Toronto
				Stadium: York Lions Stadium

September 21 24	Valour FC	1–1	HFX Wanderers FC	Winnipeg
				Stadium: Princess Auto Stadium

September 30 25	Valour FC	1–0	Pacific FC	Winnipeg
				Stadium: Princess Auto Stadium

October 6 26	Valour FC	0–1	Forge FC	Winnipeg
		Report		Stadium: Princess Auto Stadium

October 13 27	Vancouver FC	1-1	Valour FC	Langley Township
				Stadium: Willoughby Community Park

October 19 28	Valour FC	1-2	Cavalry FC	Winnipeg
				Stadium: Princess Auto Stadium

=== Canadian Championship ===
Win Draw Loss Fixtures

May 1 Preliminary round	Atlético Ottawa	7–0	Valour FC	Ottawa
				Stadium: TD Place Stadium
