= 2022 Valour FC season =

Valour FC
2022 season
- President: Wade Miller
- Head coach: Phillip Dos Santos
- Stadium: IG Field
- Canadian Premier League: 5th
- Canadian Championship: Preliminary round
- Top goalscorer: Moses Dyer (9)
Home colours	Away colours

The 2022 Valour FC season was the fourth season in the history of Valour FC. In addition to the Canadian Premier League, the club competed in the Canadian Championship.

== Current squad ==
As of September 6, 2022.

No.	Name	Nationality	Position(s)	Date of birth (age)	Previous club
Goalkeepers
1	Jonathan Sirois	(Canada)	GK	June 27, 2001 (aged 21)	(Canada) CF Montréal
99	Rayane Yesli	(Algeria)	GK	October 12, 1999 (aged 23)	(Canada) Blainville
Defenders
2	Andy Baquero	(Cuba)	RB / RW	August 17, 1994 (aged 28)	(Dominican Republic) Delfines del Este
3	Rocco Romeo	(Canada)	CB	March 25, 2000 (aged 22)	(Canada) Toronto FC
4	Tony Mikhael	(Lebanon)	CB / FB	March 1, 2000 (aged 22)	(Canada) Carleton Ravens
5	Nassim Mekideche	(Algeria)	CB	April 30, 2000 (aged 22)	(Tunisia) CS Hammam-Lif
12	Jonathan Esparza	(United States)	CB	July 9, 1999 (aged 23)	(United States) Chattanooga Red Wolves
14	Stefan Cebara	(Canada)	RB / RW / CB	April 12, 1991 (aged 31)	(Serbia) Vojvodina Novi Sad
22	Matteo de Brienne	(Canada)	LB	May 22, 2002 (aged 20)	(Canada) Carleton University
35	Andrew Jean-Baptiste	(Haiti)	CB	June 16, 1992 (aged 30)	(Sweden) Umeå FC
Midfielders
6	Jacob Carlos	(Canada)	CM	July 12, 2001 (aged 21)	(Canada) Ryerson Rams
8	Diego Gutiérrez	(Canada)	RM / RB	February 18, 1997 (aged 25)	(Chile) Barnechea
10	Kevin Rendón	(Colombia)	AM	January 8, 1993 (aged 29)	(Colombia) Deportivo Pasto
11	Alessandro Riggi	(Canada)	LW / RW	November 30, 1993 (aged 29)	(Canada) HFX Wanderers
17	Brett Levis	(Canada)	MF	March 29, 1993 (aged 29)	(Canada) Vancouver Whitecaps
27	Raphael Ohin	(Ghana)	CM	May 25, 1995 (aged 27)	(Canada) WSA Winnipeg
70	Matthew Catavolo	(Canada)	CM	February 13, 2003 (aged 19)	(Canada) CF Montréal Academy
77	Federico Peña	(Trinidad and Tobago)	MF	March 30, 1999 (aged 23)	(Belgium) Standard Liège
Forwards
7	Moses Dyer	(New Zealand)	CF / CM	March 21, 1997 (aged 25)	(Norway) Florø SK
9	Walter Ponce	(Chile)	CF	March 4, 1998 (aged 24)	(Chile) Barnechea
13	Billy Forbes	(Turks and Caicos Islands)	ST / LW / RW	December 13, 1990 (aged 32)	(United States) Detroit City
16	Daryl Fordyce	(Northern Ireland)	CF	January 2, 1987 (aged 35)	(Republic of Ireland) Sligo Rovers
24	Sean Rea	(Canada)	CF / CM	May 15, 2002 (aged 20)	(Canada) CF Montréal

== Transfers ==
=== In ===
==== Transferred in ====
No.	Pos.	Player	From club	Fee/notes	Date	Source
8	MF	(Canada) Diego Gutiérrez	(Chile) Barnechea	Free	December 21, 2021	
9	MF	(Chile) Walter Ponce	(Chile) Barnechea	Free	January 13, 2022	
22	DF	(Canada) Matteo de Brienne	(Canada) Carleton University	Free	January 18, 2022	
12	DF	(United States) Jonathan Esparza	(United States) Chattanooga Red Wolves	Free	January 21, 2022	
99	GK	(Algeria) Rayane Yesli	(Canada) Blainville	Free	January 28, 2022	
3	DF	(Canada) Rocco Romeo	(Canada) Toronto FC	Free	February 4, 2022	
11	MF	(Canada) Alessandro Riggi	(Canada) HFX Wanderers	Free	February 9, 2022	
70	MF	(Canada) Matthew Catavolo	(Canada) CF Montréal Academy	Free	February 16, 2022	
6	MF	(Canada) Jacob Carlos	(Canada) Ryerson Rams	Selected 12th overall in the 2022 CPL–U Sports Draft	April 1, 2022	
	GK	(Canada) Evan Barker	(Canada) FC Manitoba	Free	May 9, 2022	
10	MF	(Colombia) Kevin Rendón	(Colombia) Deportivo Pasto	Free	May 31, 2022	
5	DF	(Algeria) Nassim Mekideche	(Tunisia) CS Hammam-Lif	Free	July 8, 2022	

==== Loans in ====
No.	Pos.	Player	Loaned from	Fee/notes	Date	Source
20	MF	(Colombia) Daniel Ascanio	(Colombia) Real Santander	Season-long loan; recalled on September 14, 2022	January 28, 2022	
1	GK	(Canada) Jonathan Sirois	(Canada) CF Montréal	Season-long loan	March 11, 2022	
24	FW	(Canada) Sean Rea	(Canada) CF Montréal	Season-long loan	March 11, 2022	
13	FW	(Turks and Caicos Islands) Billy Forbes	(United States) Detroit City	Season-long loan	July 21, 2022	

==== Draft picks ====
Valour FC will make the following selections in the 2022 CPL–U Sports Draft. Draft picks are not automatically signed to the team roster. Only those who are signed to a contract will be listed as transfers in.

Round	Selection	Pos.	Player	Nationality	University
1	4	MF	Raine Lyn	Canada	Cape Breton
2	12	MF	Jacob Carlos	Canada	Ryerson

=== Out ===
==== Transferred out ====
No.	Pos.	Player	To club	Fee/notes	Date	Source
18	MF	(Peru) Jared Ulloa	(Peru) Sporting Cristal	Loan expired	December 31, 2021	
	DF	(Mexico) Rodrigo Reyes	(Mexico) C.D. Guadalajara	Loan expired	December 31, 2021	
12	DF	(Canada) Rocco Romeo	(Canada) Toronto FC	Loan expired	December 31, 2021	
8	MF	(Canada) Keven Alemán	(Canada) Atlético Ottawa	Contract expired	January 26, 2022	
0	GK	(Canada) Matt Silva	(Philippines) United City	Contract expired	January 29, 2022	
5	DF	(Panama) Amir Soto		Contract expired	January 29, 2022	
10	FW	(Algeria) Masta Kacher	(Canada) FC Edmonton	Contract expired	January 29, 2022	
21	MF	(Spain) José Galán	(Gibraltar) Bruno's Magpies	Contract expired	January 29, 2022	
19	FW	(South Sudan) William Akio	(Scotland) Ross County	Undisclosed fee	July 17, 2022	

== Pre-season and friendlies ==
Win Draw Loss Fixtures

March 15 Friendly	Valour FC	4–0	York United FC	Langford, British Columbia
	Levis 17'; Carlos; Rea; de Brienne			Stadium: Starlight Stadium

March 18 Friendly	Whitecaps FC 2	2–3	Valour FC	Langford, British Columbia
3:00pm	Herdman 42'; Rakic 82'	Report	Catavolo 56'; Dyer 72'; Peña 75'

== Competitions ==
Matches are listed in Winnipeg local time: Central Daylight Time (UTC−5) until November 5, and Central Standard Time (UTC−6) otherwise.

=== Overview ===
Competition	First match	Last match	Starting round	Final position	Record							
Competition	First match	Last match	Starting round	Final position	Pld	W	D	L	GF	GA	GD	Win %
Canadian Premier League	April 10	October 8	—	5th	28	10	7	11	36	34	+2	35.71
Canadian Championship	May 11	May 11	Preliminary round	Preliminary round	1	0	0	1	0	2	−2	0.00
Total					29	10	7	12	36	36	+0	34.48

Source: Competitions

=== Canadian Premier League ===
==== Table ====
Pos	Team	Pld	W	D	L	GF	GA	GD	Pts	Qualification
1	Atlético Ottawa (S)	28	13	10	5	36	29	+7	49	Advance to playoffs
2	Forge (C)	28	14	5	9	47	25	+22	47	Advance to playoffs
3	Cavalry	28	14	5	9	39	33	+6	47	Advance to playoffs
4	Pacific	28	13	7	8	36	33	+3	46	Advance to playoffs
5	Valour	28	10	7	11	36	34	+2	37	
6	York United	28	9	7	12	31	37	−6	34	
7	HFX Wanderers	28	8	5	15	24	38	−14	29	
8	FC Edmonton	28	4	8	16	31	51	−20	20	

Source: CanPL.ca
Rules for classification: 1) points; 2) total wins; 3) goal differential; 4) goals for; 5) away goals differential; 6) away goals for; 7) home goals differential; 8) home goals for; 9) U-21 minutes; 10) coin toss or drawing of lots.
(C) Champion; (S) Regular season winner

==== Results by match ====
Match	1	2	3	4	5	6	7	8	9	10	11	12	13	14	15	16	17	18	19	20	21	22	23	24	25	26	27	28
Result	D	L	W	D	W	L	D	L	D	L	W	W	W	D	L	L	W	W	L	D	W	W	W	L	D	L	L	L
Position	4	5	3	6	2	6	4	5	6	6	6	6	5	5	5	5	5	5	5	5	5	5	4	4	4	5	5	5

Updated to match(es) played on September 4, 2022. Source: #Matches
W = Win; D = Draw; L = Loss

==== Matches ====
April 10 1	FC Edmonton	1–1	Valour FC	Edmonton, Alberta
3:00pm	Warschewski 90+5'	Report	Baquero 45+1'; Dyer (yellow card) 64'; Akio (yellow card) 90'	Stadium: Clarke Stadium; Attendance: 670; Referee: Filip Dujic

April 17 2	Pacific FC	3–2	Valour FC	Langford, British Columbia
3:00pm	Aparicio 20'; Dada-Luke (yellow card) 32'; Díaz 33'; Heard 56'	Report	Mikhael (red card) 26'; Dada-Luke 42' (o.g.); Akio (yellow card) 45'; Dyer 90+3' (pen.)	Stadium: Starlight Stadium; Attendance: 2,420; Referee: Alain Ruch

April 24 3	Atlético Ottawa	1–6	Valour FC	Ottawa, Ontario
2:00pm	Sirois 40' (o.g.); McKendry (yellow card) 72'	Report	Romeo (yellow card) 8', (goal) 45'; Dyer 14' (pen.), 50'; Riggi 27', 45+2'; Levis 69'; Catavolo (yellow card) 74'	Stadium: TD Place Stadium; Attendance: 2,601; Referee: Scott Bowman

May 7 4	Valour FC	0–0	HFX Wanderers FC	Winnipeg, Manitoba
2:00pm	Baquero (yellow card) 58'; Cebara (yellow card) 79'; Levis (yellow card) 89'	Report	Gagnon-Laparé (yellow card) 32'; Schaale (yellow card) 52'; Rampersad (yellow card) 76'	Stadium: IG Field; Attendance: 3,277; Referee: Marie-Soleil Beaudoin

May 15 5	Valour FC	1–0	York United FC	Winnipeg, Manitoba
4:00pm	Dyer (yellow card) 40'; Riggi (yellow card) 56'; Gutiérrez (yellow card) 67'; Rea 87'	Report	Johnston (yellow card) 40'; Wright (yellow card) 41'; Toussaint (yellow card) 42'; Hernández (yellow card) 51'	Stadium: IG Field; Attendance: 2,416; Referee: David Barrie

May 21 6	Cavalry FC	2–1	Valour FC	Foothills County, Alberta
2:30pm	Vliet (yellow card) 45'; Bevan 85'; Adekugbe 90+2'	Report	Fordyce (yellow card) 69'; Romeo (yellow card) 84'; Baquero (yellow card) 87'; Ponce (yellow card) 87'; Cebara 89'	Stadium: ATCO Field; Attendance: 2,945; Referee: Yusri Rudolf

May 28 7	Pacific FC	2–2	Valour FC	Langford, British Columbia
6:00pm	dos Santos 56'; Díaz 71'; Đidić (yellow card) 90+3'; Baldisimo (yellow card) 90+3'	Report	Baquero (yellow card) 21'; Rea 36'; Fordyce 48'; Gutiérrez (yellow card) 90+3'; Ponce (yellow card) 90+3'	Stadium: Starlight Stadium; Attendance: 2,925; Referee: Alain Ruch

June 1 8	Valour FC	0–1	Atlético Ottawa	Winnipeg, Manitoba
7:00pm	Levis (yellow card) 10'; Riggi (yellow card) 26'; Fordyce (yellow card) 62'; Rea (yellow card) 90+2'; Romeo (yellow card) 90+7'	Report	Tabla (yellow card) 18'; Acosta (yellow card) 37'; Verhoven 84'; Moragrega (yellow card) 87'; Beckie (yellow card) 90+7'	Stadium: IG Field; Attendance: 2,699; Referee: Filip Dujic

June 5 9	Valour FC	1–1	FC Edmonton	Winnipeg, Manitoba
3:00pm	Gutiérrez (yellow card) 50'; Fordyce (yellow card) 60'; Akio 90+4'	Report	Camara 32', (yellow card) 90+1'; Bitar (yellow card) 90+1'	Stadium: IG Field; Attendance: 2,727; Referee: Renzo Villanueva

June 15 10	Valour FC	2–4	Cavalry FC	Winnipeg, Manitoba
7:00pm	Carlos (yellow card) 38'; Cebara (yellow card) 51'; Ponce 56'; Peña (yellow card) 79'; de Brienne 90+3'	Report	Cebara 4' (o.g.); Camargo 15', (yellow card) 45'; Trafford 60'; Pepple 64'	Stadium: IG Field; Attendance: 2,395; Referee: Alain Ruch

June 26 11	York United FC	1–3	Valour FC	Toronto, Ontario
11:00am	De Rosario 52'; Verhoeven (yellow card) 58'	Report	Akio (yellow card) 13'; Romeo (yellow card) 48'; Riggi 51'; Dyer 72'; Rea 89' (yellow card) 90+4'	Stadium: York Lions Stadium; Attendance: 1,002; Referee: Scott Bowman

June 29 12	Forge FC	0–1	Valour FC	Hamilton, Ontario
6:00pm	Rama (yellow card) 90+3'	Report	Ponce (yellow card) 31' (yellow-red card) 82'; Akio 61'; Sirois (yellow card) 71'; Levis (yellow card) 79'; Riggi (yellow card) 88'	Stadium: Tim Hortons Field; Attendance: 3,558; Referee: Fabrizio Stasolla

July 10 13	Valour FC	1–0	HFX Wanderers FC	Winnipeg, Manitoba
2:00pm	Riggi (yellow card) 52'; Dyer 84'; Ascanio (yellow card) 89'	Report	Gagnon-Laparé (yellow card) 78'; Polisi (yellow card) 87'	Stadium: IG Field; Attendance: 3,607; Referee: Michael Venne

July 20 14	Atlético Ottawa	1–1	Valour FC	Ottawa, Ontario
6:00pm	Moragrega 15' (pen.)	Report	Dyer 10' (pen.), (yellow card) 90+4'; Ponce (yellow card) 77'; Baquero (yellow card) 83'	Stadium: TD Place Stadium; Referee: Filip Dujic
Note: This match was originally scheduled for July 17, but was postponed due to League Covid Protocols and rescheduled to July 20.

July 23 15	Forge FC	3–1	Valour FC	Hamilton, Ontario
3:30pm	Pacius 40'; Campbell 67', 90+4'	Report	Dyer 23', (yellow card) 55'; Jean-Baptiste (yellow card) 72'; Rendón (yellow card) 84'	Stadium: Tim Hortons Field; Attendance: 1,187; Referee: Mathieu Souaré

July 30 16	Valour FC	1–2	Pacific FC	Winnipeg, Manitoba
2:00pm	de Brienne 23'; Ascanio (yellow card) 33' (yellow-red card) 62'	Report	Mukumbilwa (yellow card) 8'; Díaz 71', 73'; Daniels (yellow card) 80'	Stadium: IG Field; Attendance: 3,109; Referee: David Barrie

August 3 17	Valour FC	2–0	Cavalry FC	Winnipeg, Manitoba
7:00pm	Dyer 7', 72'; Mekidèche (yellow card) 20'; Baquero (yellow card) 67'	Report	Simmons (yellow card) 90'	Stadium: IG Field; Attendance: 3,200; Referee: Ben Hoskins

August 7 18	Valour FC	2–0	York United FC	Winnipeg, Manitoba
4:00pm	Rea 46'; Levis (yellow card) 53'; Forbes 70'	Report		Stadium: IG Field; Attendance: 2,907

August 13 19	HFX Wanderers FC	1–0	Valour FC	Halifax, Nova Scotia
1:00pm	Salter 44'; Fernandez (yellow card) 57'; Omar (yellow card) 57'; Rampersad (yellow card) 59'	Report	Gutiérrez (yellow card) 56'; Mekidèche (yellow card) 57' (yellow-red card) 67'; Dyer (yellow card) 73'	Stadium: Wanderers Grounds; Attendance: 5,652; Referee: Ben Hoskins

August 21 20	Valour FC	1–1	FC Edmonton	Winnipeg, Manitoba
1:30pm	Forbes (yellow card) 45+2'; Rea 45+3'; Levis (yellow card) 78'; Gutiérrez (yellow card) 90+3'	Report	Bissainte (yellow card) 43'; Gonzalez 47'	Stadium: IG Field; Attendance: 2,845; Referee: Scott Bowman

August 28 21	Valour FC	1–0	Pacific FC	Winnipeg, Manitoba
2:00pm	Rea (yellow card) 43'; de Brienne (yellow card) 50'; Dyer (yellow card) 56'; Romeo 62'	Report	Daniels (yellow card) 26'	Stadium: IG Field; Attendance: 2,908; Referee: Myriam Marcotte

August 31 22	Valour FC	1–0	Forge FC	Winnipeg, Manitoba
7:00pm	de Brienne 20'; Levis (yellow card) 37'; Gutiérrez (yellow card) 49'; Dyer (yellow card) 82' (yellow-red card) 90+9'; Mekidèche (yellow card) 82'	Report	Hojabrpour (yellow card) 14'; Sissoko (yellow card) 30'; Grant (yellow card) 82'; Rama (yellow card) 82'; Henry (yellow card) 90+8'; Borges (yellow card) 90+9'; Welshman (yellow card) 90+10'	Stadium: IG Field; Attendance: 3,384; Referee: Yusri Rudolf
Note: This match was originally scheduled for May 1, but was postponed due to League Covid Protocols. It was rescheduled to August 31.

September 4 23	Valour FC	1–0	Forge FC	Winnipeg, Manitoba
1:00pm	Fordyce (yellow card) 31'; Levis 73'; Riggi (yellow card) 75' (yellow-red card) 90+3'; Cebara (yellow card) 81'; de Brienne (yellow card) 88'	Report	Rama (yellow card) 17'; Hojabrpour (yellow card) 50'; Borges (yellow card) 90+3'	Stadium: IG Field; Attendance: 2,846; Referee: Alain Ruch

September 10 24	HFX Wanderers FC	1–0	Valour FC	Halifax, Nova Scotia
1:00pm	Salter 33'; Fernandez (yellow card) 65'; Polisi (yellow card) 66'; Baskett (yellow card) 80'	Report		Stadium: Wanderers Grounds; Attendance: 6,058; Referee: Renzo Villanueva

September 18 25	Valour FC	1–1	Atlético Ottawa	Winnipeg, Manitoba
4:00pm	Jean-Baptiste 68'	Report	Camus (yellow card) 41'; Shaw (yellow card) 63'; Bassett 85'; Alemán (yellow card) 85'	Stadium: IG Field; Attendance: 5,227; Referee: Michael Venne

September 23 26	York United FC	3–1	Valour FC	Toronto, Ontario
6:30pm	Babouli 34'; N'sa 56'; Lawrie-Lattanzio 75'	Report	Cebara 16' (pen.); Romeo (yellow card) 44'; Rendón (yellow card) 90+2'	Stadium: York Lions Stadium; Attendance: 1,402; Referee: Yusri Rudolf

October 2 27	Cavalry FC	2–1	Valour FC	Foothills County, Alberta
2:30pm	Joe Mason (footballer, born 1991) 39'; Ali Musse 81'	Report	Nassim Mekidèche (yellow card) 22'; Billy Forbes 48'; Matteo de Brienne (yellow card) 74'; Stefan Cebara (yellow card) 77'	Stadium: ATCO Field; Attendance: 2,662; Referee: Alain Ruch

October 8 28	FC Edmonton	3–1	Valour FC	Edmonton, Alberta
2:00pm	Mamadi Camara (yellow card) 24'; Tobias Warschewski 31'; Wesley-Thomas Lança Timóteo 36'; Bicou Bissainte (yellow card) 40'; Terique David Mohammed (yellow card) 87'; Gabriel Bitar 84'	Report	Walter Benjamin Ponce Gallardo 18'; Andrew Jean-Baptiste (yellow card) 30'; Kevin Camilo Rendón Guerrero (yellow card) 55'; Antonio Rocco Romeo (yellow card) 68'; Andy Baquero Ruiz (yellow card) 80'; Daryl Thomas Fordyce (red card) 82'; Matteo de Brienne (yellow card) 90'	Stadium: Clarke Stadium; Attendance: 1,197; Referee: Mathieu Souaré

=== Canadian Championship ===
May 11 PR	Vancouver Whitecaps FC	2–0	Valour FC	Vancouver, British Columbia
9:00pm	Teibert 19'; Raposo 22'; Cavallini (yellow card) 52'	Report	Fordyce (yellow card) 74'	Stadium: BC Place; Attendance: 7,809; Referee: Alain Ruch

== Statistics ==
=== Squad and statistics ===
As of April 10, 2022

No.	Pos	Nat	Player	Total		Canadian Premier League		Canadian Championship	
No.	Pos	Nat	Player	Apps	Goals	Apps	Goals	Apps	Goals
1	GK	(Canada) CAN	Jonathan Sirois	1	0	1+0	0	0+0	0
2	DF	(Cuba) CUB	Andy Baquero	1	1	1+0	1	0+0	0
3	DF	(Canada) CAN	Rocco Romeo	1	0	1+0	0	0+0	0
6	MF	(Canada) CAN	Jacob Carlos	1	0	0+1	0	0+0	0
7	MF	(New Zealand) NZL	Moses Dyer	1	0	1+0	0	0+0	0
8	MF	(Canada) CAN	Diego Gutiérrez	1	0	1+0	0	0+0	0
11	FW	(Canada) CAN	Alessandro Riggi	1	0	0+1	0	0+0	0
12	DF	(United States) USA	Jonathan Esparza	1	0	0+1	0	0+0	0
14	DF	(Canada) CAN	Stefan Cebara	1	0	1+0	0	0+0	0
16	FW	(Northern Ireland) NIR	Daryl Fordyce	1	0	1+0	0	0+0	0
19	FW	(South Sudan) SSD	William Akio	1	0	1+0	0	0+0	0
22	DF	(Canada) CAN	Matteo de Brienne	1	0	0+1	0	0+0	0
24	MF	(Canada) CAN	Sean Rea	1	0	1+0	0	0+0	0
70	MF	(Canada) CAN	Matthew Catavolo	1	0	1+0	0	0+0	0
77	DF	(Trinidad and Tobago) TRI	Federico Peña	1	0	1+0	0	0+0	0
99	GK	(Algeria) ALG	Rayane Yesli	0	0	0+0	0	0+0	0

=== Top scorers ===
Rank	Nat.	Player	Pos.	Canadian Premier League	Canadian Championship	TOTAL
1	(Cuba)	Andy Baquero	DF	1	0	1
Totals				1	0	1

=== Disciplinary record ===
No.	Pos.	Nat.	Player	Canadian Premier League		Canadian Championship		TOTAL	
No.	Pos.	Nat.	Player	Booked	Sent off (straight red)	Booked	Sent off (straight red)	Booked	Sent off (straight red)
7	MF	(New Zealand)	Moses Dyer	1	0	0	0	1	0
19	FW	(South Sudan)	William Akio	1	0	0	0	1	0
Totals				2	0	0	0	2	0
