= Juan Pablo Sánchez =

American soccer player (born 2003)

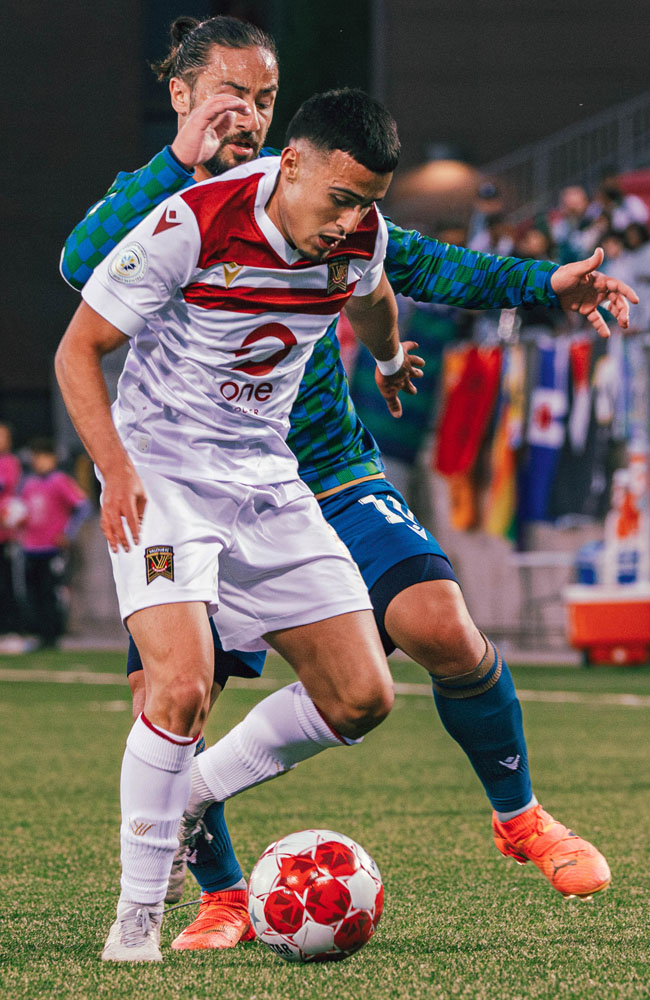
- Sanchez playing for Valour FC in 2024.

Personal information
- Full name: Juan Pablo Sánchez Zapata
- Date of birth: April 18, 2003 (age 23)
- Place of birth: Hartford, Connecticut, United States
- Height: 5 ft 7 in (1.70 m)
- Position: Midfielder

Youth career
- Toronto FC
- 2021–2022: Salgueiros

Senior career*
Years	Team	Apps	(Gls)
2022	Salgueiros	2	(0)
2023–2024	Valour FC	36	(1)
2026	International FC	7	(2)
- * Club domestic league appearances and goals as of July 12, 2026

Juan Pablo Sánchez Zapata (born April 18, 2003) is an American soccer player who plays as a midfielder.

== Early life ==
Born in the United States to Colombian parents, Sánchez moved to Burlington, Canada with his family at age four, and holds American, Canadian and Colombian citizenship. He played youth soccer with the Toronto FC Academy.

== Club career ==
In September 2021, Sánchez joined Salgueiros of the Portuguese fourth tier Campeonato de Portugal. In 2022, Sánchez made his senior debut with the team. In July 2022, he re-signed with the club for another season.

In January 2023, he joined Valour FC of the Canadian Premier League. On May 26, 2024, he scored his first professional goal in a 1–1 draw against Cavalry FC.

== Career statistics ==
As of October 19, 2024

Appearances and goals by club, season and competition
Club	Season	League			Playoffs		National cup		Continental		Total	
Club	Season	Division	Apps	Goals	Apps	Goals	Apps	Goals	Apps	Goals	Apps	Goals
Salgueiros	2021–22	Campeonato de Portugal	2	0	–		0	0	–		2	0
Valour FC	2023	Canadian Premier League	21	0	–		1	0	–		22	0
Valour FC	2024	Canadian Premier League	15	1	–		1	0	–		16	1
Valour FC	Total		36	1	0	0	2	0	0	0	38	1
Career total			38	1	0	0	2	0	0	0	40	1
