= Jacob Carlos =

Canadian soccer player (born 2001)

Personal information
- Date of birth: July 12, 2001 (age 25)
- Place of birth: Mississauga, Ontario, Canada
- Height: 1.78 m (5 ft 10 in)
- Position: Midfielder

Team information
- Current team: Scrosoppi FC

Youth career
- Erin Mills Eagles
- 2016–2017: IK Frej
- 2017–2018: Académico de Viseu
- 2017–2018: Erin Mills Eagles
- 2018–2020: Toronto FC

College career
Years	Team	Apps	(Gls)
2021	Ryerson Rams	12	(2)

Senior career*
Years	Team	Apps	(Gls)
2022	Valour FC	12	(0)
2023	North Toronto Nitros	4	(1)
2024	Scrosoppi FC	22	(10)
2026–	Scrosoppi FC	1	(0)
- * Club domestic league appearances and goals as of April 18, 2026

Jacob Carlos (born July 12, 2001) is a Canadian soccer player who plays as a midfielder for Scrosoppi FC in the Ontario Premier League.

== Early life ==
Carlos played youth soccer with the Erin Mills Eagles. In 2016, he joined the youth system of Swedish club IK Frej. In 2017, he joined the youth system of Portuguese club Académico de Viseu. He also played with his former club Erin Mills Eagles during the 2017 and 2018 summers, winning Ontario Cups both years, winning a total of three during his youth career. In 2018, he joined the Toronto FC Academy.

== University career ==
In 2020, he began attending Ryerson University, where he would play for the men's soccer team. His debut was delayed until the 2021 season due to the COVID-19 pandemic. During his rookie season he scored two goals and added two assists in 11 games. He did not return to the school team in 2022.

== Club career ==
Carlos was selected in the second round (11th overall) by Canadian Premier League club Valour FC in the 2022 CPL-U Sports Draft. On April 1, he signed a developmental contract with the club for the 2022 season. He made his debut on April 10, in a substitute appearance against FC Edmonton.

In April 2023, he joined the North Toronto Nitros in League1 Ontario.

In 2024, he played with Scrosoppi FC in League1 Ontario and was named a league First Team All-Star.

== Career statistics ==
As of match played September 4, 2024

Club statistics
Club	Season	League			Playoffs		Domestic Cup		Other		Total	
Club	Season	Division	Apps	Goals	Apps	Goals	Apps	Goals	Apps	Goals	Apps	Goals
Valour FC	2022	Canadian Premier League	12	0	—		1	0	—		13	0
North Toronto Nitros	2023	League1 Ontario	4	1	—		—		—		1	0
Scrosoppi FC	2024	League1 Ontario Premier	22	10	—		—		1	0	23	10
Career total			38	11	0	0	1	0	1	0	40	11
