= Darlington Murasiranwa =

Zimbabwean footballer (born 2001)

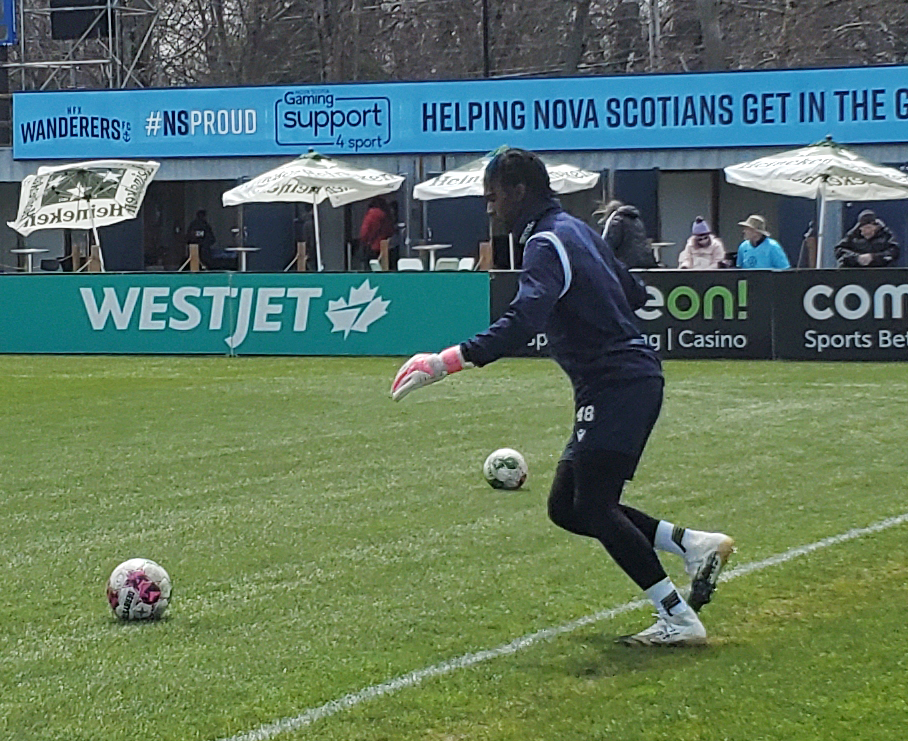
- Murasiranwa in 2022 with FC Edmonton

Personal information
- Full name: Darlington Ngonidzashe Murasiranwa
- Date of birth: February 7, 2001 (age 25)
- Place of birth: Zimbabwe
- Height: 1.83 m (6 ft 0 in)
- Position: Goalkeeper

Youth career
- Cape Town Barca Juniors
- 2014–2016: FC Edmonton
- 2016–2018: Vancouver Whitecaps FC
- 2018–2019: FC Edmonton

College career
Years	Team	Apps	(Gls)
2019–2020	Guelph Gryphons	3	(0)

Senior career*
Years	Team	Apps	(Gls)
2021–2022	FC Edmonton	13	(0)
2023	FC London	16	(0)
2023–2024	Valour FC	5	(0)
2025–	Ngezi Platinum	0	(0)
- * Club domestic league appearances and goals as of February 28, 2025

Darlington Ngonidzashe Murasiranwa (born February 7, 2001) is a Zimbabwean professional footballer who plays as a goalkeeper for Ngezi Platinum in the Zimbabwe Premier Soccer League.

== Early life ==
Murasiranwa was born in Zimbabwe, later moving to South Africa where he began playing football in Cape Town with Barca Juniors at age 9. When he was 13, he moved to Edmonton, Canada, re-uniting with his parents (including meeting his father for the first time), who had moved to North America, when Darlington was an infant in search of a better life for the family due to the economic hardships in their homeland, leaving him with his grandparents. In Edmonton, he joined the FC Edmonton academy. He joined the Vancouver Whitecaps Academy at U16 level, before returning to the FC Edmonton academy.

== University career ==
In 2019, he began attending the University of Guelph, playing for the men's soccer team. He kept clean sheets in his first two starts. Ahead of the 2021 season, he announced he was transferring to MacEwan University where he would play for the MacEwan Griffins. However, he ultimately turned pro instead a couple of months later.

== Club career ==
Murasiranwa signed with Canadian Premier League side FC Edmonton on February 5, 2021. He made his debut for Edmonton on August 15 in a Canadian Championship match against Cavalry FC. He made six appearances in his first season, keeping a clean sheet in the 1–0 victory in the final game of the season against Forge FC. In February 2022, Edmonton announced that Murasiranwa would be returning to the team for the 2022 season. Following the 2022 season, Murasiranza trained with English non-league side Shepshed Dynamo.

After FC Edmonton folded following the 2022 season, he joined FC London in League1 Ontario in March 2023. Over the course of the season, he made sixteen appearances for the club.

In August 2023, after the League1 Ontario season, he returned to the Canadian Premier League, signing a contract with Valour FC for the remainder of the season, with a club option for 2024.

In February 2025, he signed with Ngezi Platinum in the Zimbabwe Premier Soccer League.

== International career ==
Murasiranwa has participated in camps at the U15 and U17 level for Canada.

== Career statistics ==
As of October 20, 2024

Club	League	Season	League		Playoffs		National Cup		Other		Total	
Club	League	Season	Apps	Goals	Apps	Goals	Apps	Goals	Apps	Goals	Apps	Goals
FC Edmonton	2021	Canadian Premier League	5	0	—		1	0	—		6	0
FC Edmonton	2022	Canadian Premier League	8	0	—		0	0	—		8	0
FC Edmonton	Total		13	0	0	0	1	0	0	0	14	0
FC London	2023	League1 Ontario	16	0	—		—		—		16	0
Valour FC	2023	Canadian Premier League	2	0	—		0	0	—		2	0
Valour FC	2024	Canadian Premier League	3	0	—		1	0	—		4	0
Valour FC	Total		5	0	0	0	1	0	0	0	6	0
Career Total			34	0	0	0	2	0	0	0	36	0
