= Diogo Ressurreição =

Portuguese footballer

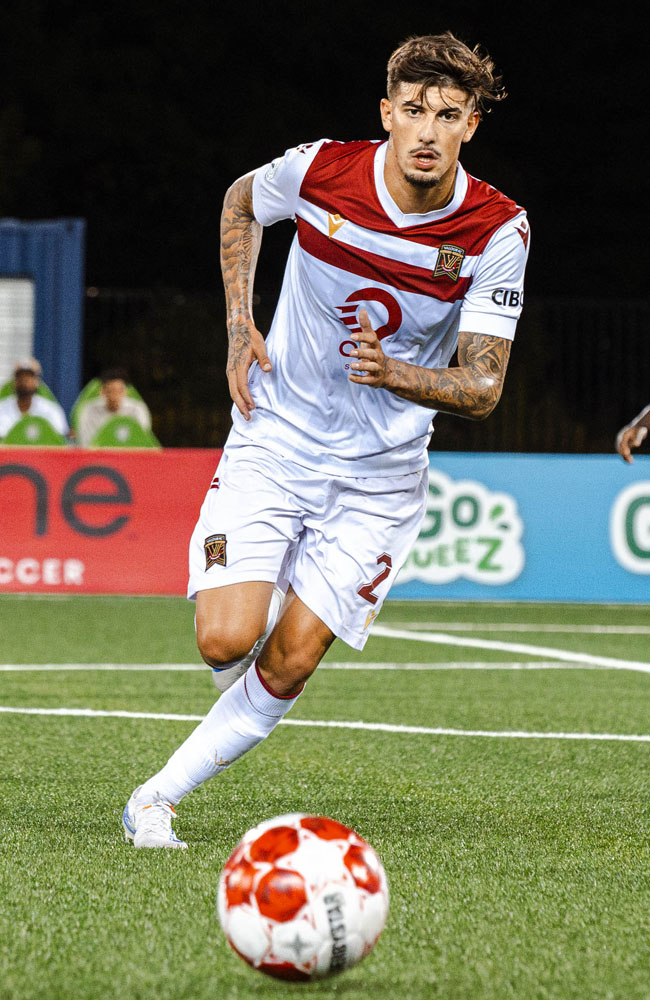
- Ressurreição playing for Valour FC in 2024.

Personal information
- Full name: Diogo Dias Ressurreição
- Date of birth: 15 August 2000 (age 26)
- Place of birth: Cascais, Portugal
- Height: 1.82 m (6 ft 0 in)
- Position: Midfielder

Team information
- Current team: União de Santarém
- Number: 10

Youth career
- 2008–2017: Estoril Praia
- 2017–2019: 1º Dezembro

Senior career*
Years	Team	Apps	(Gls)
2019	1º Dezembro	2	(0)
2019–2022	Porto B	15	(1)
2022–2023	Vitória Guimarães B	19	(1)
2024–2025	Valour FC	53	(4)
2026	Dobrudzha	8	(0)
2026–	União de Santarém	5	(0)
- * Club domestic league appearances and goals as of 12 September 2026

Diogo Dias da Ressurreição (born 15 August 2000) is a Portuguese professional footballer who plays as a midfielder for Liga 3 club União de Santarém.

== Early life ==
Ressurreição was born in Cascais, Portugal. He began playing youth football with Estoril Praia, where he played for nine years. He joined the youth system of 1º Dezembro in 2017. In April 2019, he scored a free kick goal from 60 metres out in a youth match against Alta de Lisboa.

== Club career ==
In June 2018, he signed a professional contract with 1º Dezembro.

In June 2019, he signed with FC Porto B.

In July 2022, Ressurreição signed a three-year contract with Vitória de Guimarães B until 2025, joining on a free transfer. After making 19 appearances for the side in Liga Portugal 3 during the 2022-23 season, the club was relegated to the fourth tier Campeonato de Portugal for the 2023-24 season, but he did not make any appearances. On 2 January 2024, it was announced that his contract had been mutually terminated.

In April 2024, Ressurreição signed with Canadian Premier League side Valour FC. He scored his first goal on 20 May 2024 in a 2-1 victory over HFX Wanderers FC. He departed the club after the 2025 season.

In March 2026, he signed with Dobrudzha in the Bulgarian First League.

In August 2026, he returned to Portugal and signed with Liga 3 club União de Santarém.

== Career statistics ==
As of 24 October 2025

Appearances and goals by club, season and competition
Club	Season	League			National Cup		Continental		Other		Total	
Club	Season	Division	Apps	Goals	Apps	Goals	Apps	Goals	Apps	Goals	Apps	Goals
1º Dezembro	2018–19	Campeonato de Portugal	2	0	0	0	–		0	0	2	0
Porto B	2019–20	Liga Portugal 2	0	0	–		–		–		0	0
Porto B	2020–21	Liga Portugal 2	5	0	–		–		–		5	0
Porto B	2021–22	Liga Portugal 2	10	1	–		–		–		10	1
Porto B	Total		15	1	0	0	0	0	0	0	15	1
Vitória Guimarães B	2022–23	Liga Portugal 3	19	1	–		–		–		19	1
Vitória Guimarães B	2023–24	Campeonato de Portugal	0	0	–		–		–		0	0
Vitória Guimarães B	Total		19	1	0	0	0	0	0	0	19	1
Valour FC	2024	Canadian Premier League	27	3	1	0	–		–		28	3
Valour FC	2025	Canadian Premier League	26	1	2	1	–		–		28	2
Valour FC	Total		53	4	3	1	0	0	0	0	56	5
Career total			89	6	3	1	0	0	0	0	92	7
