= Matthew Catavolo =

Canadian soccer player

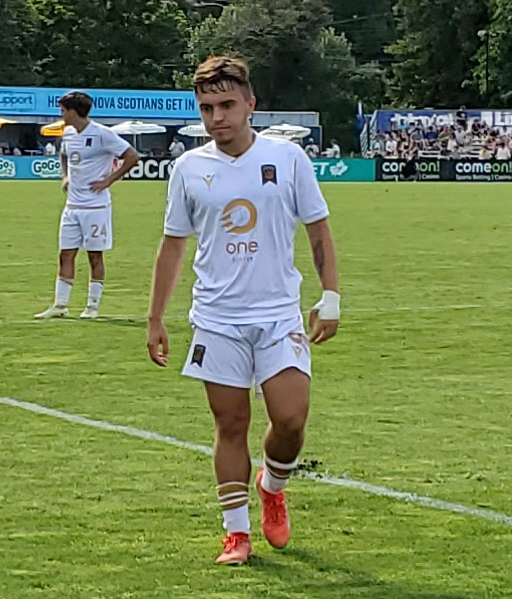
- Catavolo with Valour FC in 2022

Personal information
- Full name: Matthew Umberto Catavolo
- Date of birth: February 13, 2003 (age 23)
- Place of birth: Montreal, Quebec, Canada
- Height: 1.60 m (5 ft 3 in)
- Position: Midfielder

Youth career
- ASTMP St-Michel
- CF Montréal

Senior career*
Years	Team	Apps	(Gls)
2022	Valour FC	16	(0)
2023–2024	Toronto FC II	36	(1)
2025	Fort Wayne FC	10	(2)
2025–	CS St-Laurent	9	(5)

International career^{‡}
2019	Canada U17	8	(0)
2022	Canada U20	6	(3)
- * Club domestic league appearances and goals as of September 22, 2025 ‡ National team caps and goals as of June 26, 2022

Matthew Umberto Catavolo (born February 13, 2003) is a Canadian professional soccer player who plays for CS St-Laurent in Ligue1 Québec.

== Early life ==
Catavolo began playing soccer at age three with ASTMP St-Michel. He later joined the CF Montréal Academy at age 13. In 2021, he spent much of the season training with the first team and also played with the CF Montreal U23 team, being the team's top scorer.

== Club career ==
In February 2022, he signed his first professional contract with Valour FC of the Canadian Premier League. He made his debut in Valour's season-opener against FC Edmonton on April 10.

In March 2023, he signed with Toronto FC II in MLS Next Pro. He scored his first goal on May 14, 2023, against New England Revolution II. Catavolo's contract expired following the 2024 season.

In 2025, he joined Fort Wayne FC in USL League Two. After the end of the USL League Two season, he joined CS St-Laurent in Ligue1 Québec.

== International career ==
Catavolo made his debut in the Canadian program, attending a camp with the Canada U17 team in March 2019. He was subsequently named to the rosters for the 2019 CONCACAF U-17 Championship and the 2019 FIFA U-17 World Cup.

In April 2022, he received his first call-up to the under-20s for a pair of friendlies against Costa Rica. In the first game on April 15, Catavolo scored his first goal for the youth teams, netting the third goal in a 3–0 victory. In June 2022, he was named to the Canadian U-20 team for the 2022 CONCACAF U-20 Championship. He scored his first goal in an official international competition on June 22 against Saint Kitts & Nevis U20, where he scored two goals in a 4-0 victory.

== Career statistics ==
As of September 27, 2025

Club	Season	League			Playoffs		Domestic Cup		Other		Total	
Club	Season	Division	Apps	Goals	Apps	Goals	Apps	Goals	Apps	Goals	Apps	Goals
Valour FC	2022	Canadian Premier League	16	0	—		1	0	—		17	0
Toronto FC II	2023	MLS Next Pro	20	1	—		—		—		20	1
Toronto FC II	2024	MLS Next Pro	16	0	—		—		—		16	0
Toronto FC II	Total		36	1	0	0	0	0	0	0	36	1
Fort Wayne FC	2025	USL League Two	10	2	2	0	—		—		12	2
CS St-Laurent	2025	Ligue1 Québec	2	2	—		—		3	0	5	2
Career total			64	5	2	0	1	0	3	0	70	5
