= Jonathan Sirois =

Canadian soccer player (born 2001)

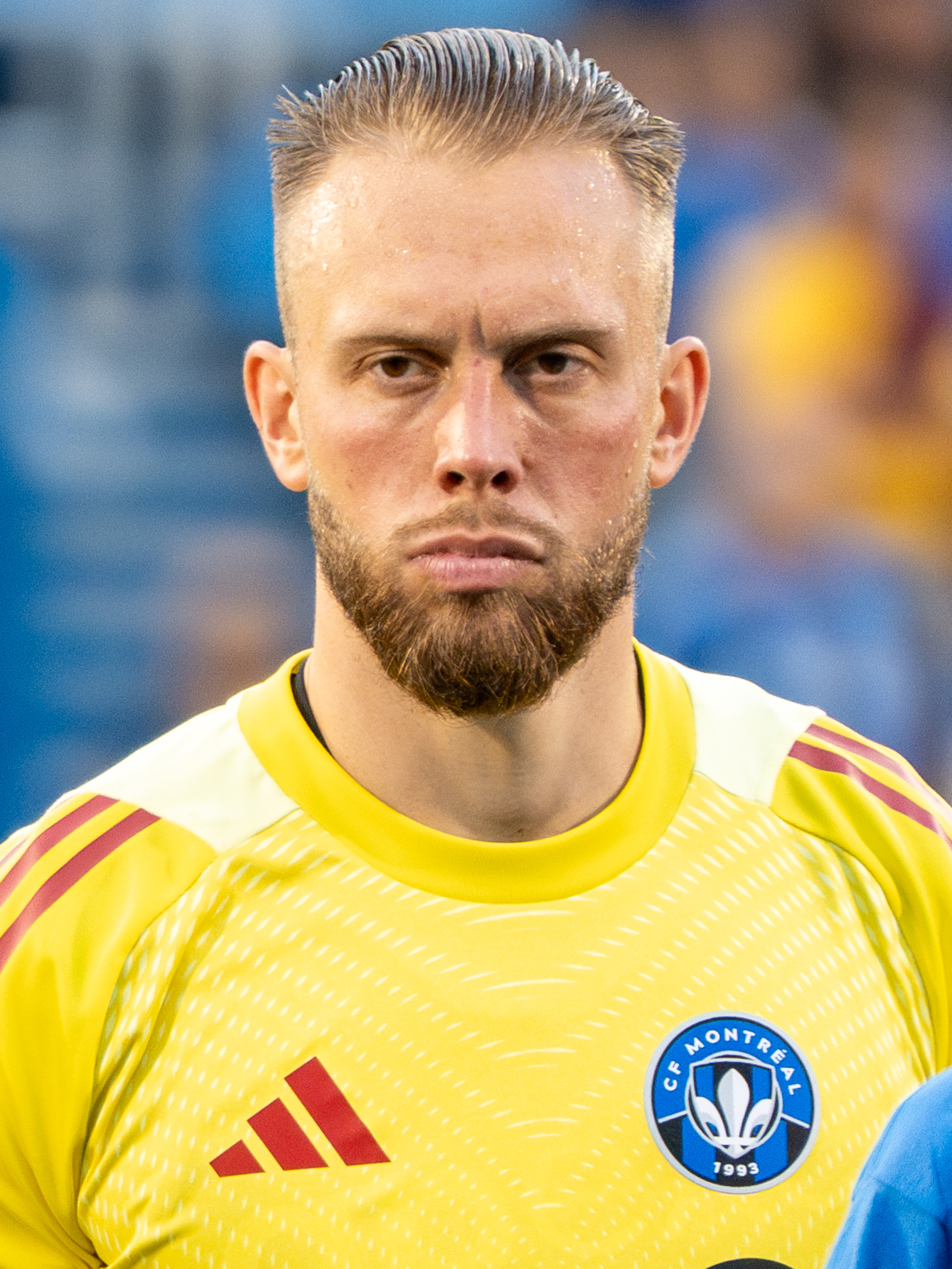
- Sirois with CF Montréal in 2025

Personal information
- Date of birth: June 27, 2001 (age 25)
- Place of birth: LaSalle, Quebec, Canada
- Height: 1.87 m (6 ft 2 in)
- Position: Goalkeeper

Team information
- Current team: FC Dallas
- Number: 40

Youth career
- CS St-Hubert
- 2015–2020: Montreal Impact

Senior career*
Years	Team	Apps	(Gls)
2020–2025	CF Montréal (Note: Montreal Impact changed its name to CF Montréal in 2021)	89	(0)
2020	→ Vancouver Whitecaps FC (loan)	0	(0)
2021–2022	→ Valour FC (loan)	43	(0)
2026–	FC Dallas	12	(0)
- * Club domestic league appearances and goals as of October 31, 2026

Jonathan Sirois (born June 27, 2001) is a Canadian soccer player who plays as a goalkeeper for Major League Soccer club FC Dallas.

== Early life ==
Born in the LaSalle neighbourhood of Montreal, Sirois grew up in Saint-Hubert, Quebec, where he played youth soccer with Chelsea CS St-Hubert before moving to the Montreal Impact Academy in 2015, where he played for the U15, U17, and U19 teams. He was invited to the Generation Adidas International Elite Soccer Program in 2018.

== Club career ==
After his time in the academy, he signed a first team contract with the Montreal Impact to serve as the team's third goalkeeper on 6 March 2020. He became the 18th academy player to sign a Homegrown Player Contract with the club.

On 22 July 2020, Sirois joined the Vancouver Whitecaps FC on a one-day emergency loan, to serve as the team's backup goalkeeper against Chicago Fire FC during the MLS is Back Tournament. Vancouver was left with only third string goalkeeper Thomas Hasal available after the team's other two goalkeepers, Maxime Crepeau and Bryan Meredith, were unavailable due to injury and a family situation, respectively. The team was also not able to add the league's pool goalkeepers to the roster because the transfer window was closed, due to pool goalkeeper Charlie Lyon's International Transfer Certificate being in the US, while the Whitecaps were a Canadian team, while the other pool, Caleb Patterson-Sewell, whose ITC was in Canada, had already left the bio-secure bubble that the tournament was being hosted in (which is also the reason they could not add an outside keeper). Sirois was able to be added to the roster, due to the Impact being a Canadian team as well, which meant his ITC was already in Canada, as well as already being in the bubble. Upon completion of the 2021 MLS season, CF Montréal announced that they would exercise the option on Sirois' contract for 2022.

In 2021, he was sent on loan to Valour FC of the Canadian Premier League to gain match experience. He made his debut for Valour on June 27 against Forge FC, recording a clean sheet in a 2–0 victory. He began the season with six consecutive clean sheets, setting a league record. On August 17, he was recalled from his loan by Montreal on an emergency basis, and on August 23, he returned to Valour. At the conclusion of the season, Sirois was named the 2021 CPL Goalkeeper of the year. After attending Montreal's pre-season training camp ahead of the 2022 season, he was once again sent to Valour on a new loan deal.

On February 25, 2023, Sirois made his competitive debut for Montreal, entering as an injury replacement for James Pantemis. After winning the starting goalkeeper role with Montreal, Sirois would sign a three-year contract extension with the club, with an option for the 2027 season. During the 2023 season, Sirois set a team record with 11 shutouts, and was named the team's Defensive Player of the Year after the season.

== International career ==
In May 2023, Sirois was listed on the Canada preliminary rosters for the 2023 CONCACAF Nations League Finals. In March 2024, Sirois was called up to Canada's squad for their 2024 Copa América qualifying play-offs against Trinidad and Tobago.

== Career statistics ==
As of match played October 31, 2026

Appearances and goals by club, season and competition
Club	Season	League			Playoffs		Domestic Cup		Continental		Other		Total	
Club	Season	Division	Apps	Goals	Apps	Goals	Apps	Goals	Apps	Goals	Apps	Goals	Apps	Goals
CF Montréal	2020	MLS	0	0	—		—		0	0	0	0	0	0
CF Montréal	2023	MLS	33	0	—		3	0	—		2	0	38	0
CF Montréal	2024	MLS	33	0	1	0	0	0	—		2	0	36	0
CF Montréal	2025	MLS	23	0	—		3	0	—		2	0	28	0
CF Montréal	Total		89	0	1	0	6	0	—		6	0	102	0
Valour FC (loan)	2021	CPL	19	0	—		—		—		—		19	0
Valour FC (loan)	2022	CPL	24	0	—		—		—		—		24	0
Valour FC (loan)	Total		43	0	—		—		—		—		43	0
FC Dallas	2026	MLS	12	0	0	0	0	0	0	0	3	0	15	0
Career total			144	0	1	0	6	0	0	0	9	0	160	0

== Honours ==
=== Individual ===
- Canadian Premier League Golden Glove: 2021
