= Dante Campbell =

Canadian soccer player (born 1999)

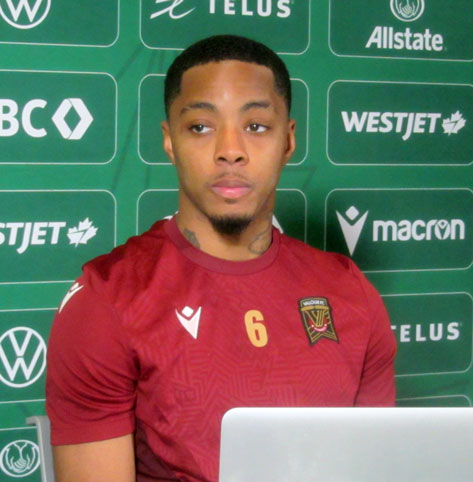
- Campbell in 2024

Personal information
- Date of birth: May 22, 1999 (age 27)
- Place of birth: Etobicoke, Ontario, Canada
- Height: 1.78 m (5 ft 10 in)
- Position: Midfielder

Youth career
- Brampton East SC
- 2013–2017: Toronto FC

Senior career*
Years	Team	Apps	(Gls)
2016–2018	Toronto FC III	40	(9)
2016–2021	Toronto FC II	69	(1)
2020	→ Valour FC (loan)	5	(0)
2022	LA Galaxy II	30	(1)
2023–2025	Valour FC	50	(2)

International career^{‡}
2015	Canada U17	3	(0)
2017	Canada U18	2	(0)
2017–2018	Canada U20	5	(0)
- * Club domestic league appearances and goals as of October 27, 2025 ‡ National team caps and goals as of May 8, 2019

Dante Campbell (born May 22, 1999) is a Canadian professional soccer player who plays as a midfielder.

== Early life ==
Campbell began playing youth soccer with Brampton East SC at age seven. When he was 13, he joined the Toronto FC Academy.

== Club career ==
In 2016, Campbell began playing at the senior level with Toronto FC III in the Premier Development League and League1 Ontario.

On July 31, 2016, Campbell made his professional debut with Toronto FC II in the USL, as an academy call-up, against Bethlehem Steel FC, in a substitute appearance. In July 2017, he signed a full professional contract with Toronto FC II. In April 2019, he signed a two-year extension with the team. In August 2020, after TFC2 opted out of the 2020 season, due to travel restrictions caused by the COVID-19 pandemic, Campbell was loaned to Valour FC of the Canadian Premier League. He made five appearances for Valour in the shortened 2020 season, before returning to Toronto FC II. In April 2021, he extended his contract for another season.

In March 2022, Campbell joined USL Championship side LA Galaxy II. He scored his first goal on April 23, 2022 against the Las Vegas Lights.

In February 2023, Campbell returned to Valour FC on a permanent contract. On September 8, 2023, he scored his first goal for the club in a 3-1 victory over York United FC and subsequently being named the CPL Player of the Week. In December 2023, he officially extended his contract with the club through the 2024 season. After the 2024 season, the club picked up his option for the 2025 season.

== International career ==
Campbell made his debut in the Canadian national program in November 2013, attending a Canada U15 youth camp. He was named to the Canadian U17 team for the 2015 CONCACAF U-17 Championship. Campbell was named to the Canadian Under-20 squad for the 2017 CONCACAF U-20 Championship and 2018 CONCACAF U-20 Championship.

== Career statistics ==
As of October 27, 2025

Club	Season	League			Domestic Cup		League Cup		Continental		Total	
Club	Season	Division	Apps	Goals	Apps	Goals	Apps	Goals	Apps	Goals	Apps	Goals
Toronto FC III	2016	PDL	10	0	–		–		–		10	0
Toronto FC III	2016	League1 Ontario	18	8	–		?	?	–		18	8
Toronto FC III	2017	League1 Ontario	10	1	–		?	?	–		10	1
Toronto FC III	2018	League1 Ontario	2	0	–		?	?	–		2	0
Toronto FC III	Total		40	9	0	0	0	0	0	0	40	9
Toronto FC II	2016	USL	1	0	–		–		–		1	0
Toronto FC II	2017	USL	11	0	–		–		–		11	0
Toronto FC II	2018	USL	22	1	–		–		–		22	1
Toronto FC II	2019	USL League One	15	0	–		–		–		15	0
Toronto FC II	2021	USL League One	20	0	–		–		–		20	0
Toronto FC II	Total		69	1	0	0	0	0	0	0	69	1
Valour FC (loan)	2020	Canadian Premier League	5	0	–		–		–		5	0
LA Galaxy II	2022	USL Championship	30	1	–		–		–		30	1
Valour FC	2023	Canadian Premier League	25	1	–		1	0	–		26	1
Valour FC	2024	Canadian Premier League	24	1	–		1	0	–		25	1
Valour FC	2025	Canadian Premier League	1	0	–		0	0	–		1	0
Valour FC	Total		50	2	0	0	2	0	0	0	52	2
Career total			175	13	0	0	2	0	0	0	196	13
