= Daniel Ascanio =

Colombian footballer (born 2000)

Personal information
- Full name: José Daniel Ascanio Aparicio
- Date of birth: 13 May 2000 (age 26)
- Place of birth: Bucaramanga, Colombia
- Height: 1.73 m (5 ft 8 in)
- Position: Midfielder

Team information
- Current team: Real Santander

Youth career
- Real Santander

Senior career*
Years	Team	Apps	(Gls)
2020–	Real Santander	33	(4)
2022	→ Valour FC (loan)	4	(0)
- * Club domestic league appearances and goals as of 15:31, 6 September 2022 (UTC)

José Daniel Ascanio Aparicio (born 13 May 2000) is a Colombian professional footballer who plays for Categoría Primera B club Real Santander.

== Career ==
After playing with the youth teams of Real Santander, Ascanio made his senior debut in the Colombian second tier Categoría Primera B.

In January 2022, he went on loan with Valour FC of the Canadian Premier League. However, his arrival to the club was delayed due to visa issues. He made his debut on 10 July, recording an assist in a 1–0 victory over HFX Wanderers FC. After a season-ending injury, his loan was terminated in early September, so that he could return to Colombia.
