= Matthew Chandler (soccer) =

Canadian soccer player (born 2000)

Personal information
- Full name: Matthew Peter Chandler
- Date of birth: February 7, 2000 (age 26)
- Place of birth: Toronto, Ontario, Canada
- Height: 6 ft 6 in (1.98 m)
- Position: Defender

Team information
- Current team: Adelaide Comets

Youth career
- Markham FC

College career
| Years | Team | Apps | (Gls) |
| 2018–2021 | St. John's Red Storm | 52 | (0) |
| 2022 | Wisconsin Badgers | 16 | (2) |

Senior career*
| Years | Team | Apps | (Gls) |
| 2021 | Manhattan SC | 11 | (0) |
| 2022 | Blue Devils FC | 13 | (0) |
| 2023 | Valour FC | 1 | (0) |
| 2024 | North Toronto Nitros | 18 | (1) |
| 2025–2026 | Adelaide Comets | 31 | (0) |
- * Club domestic league appearances and goals as of August 24, 2024

Matthew Peter Chandler (born February 7, 2000) is a Canadian soccer player who plays for the Adelaide Comets in NPL South Australia.

== Early life ==
Chandler played youth soccer with Markham FC.

== College career ==
In 2018, he began attending St. John's University, where he played for the men's soccer team. On September 21, 2018, he made his collegiate debut against the Xavier Musketeers. He earned his first start on September 25, 2018 against the Mount St. Mary's Mountaineers. In September 2019, he was named the Big East Conference Defensive Player of the Week. In October 2021, he was named to the Big East Weekly Honor Roll. He graduated with a degree in sports management, with a minor in business, and was named to the Big East Conference All-Academic Team each year from 2018 through 2021.

In 2022, after graduating from St. John's, Chandler began attending the University of Wisconsin–Madison for his master's degree, also joining the men's soccer team. He was named a team captain that season. He scored his first goal in the season opener on August 25 against the Utah Tech Trailblazers.

== Club career ==
In 2021, he played with Manhattan SC in USL League Two.

In 2022, he played with Blue Devils FC in League1 Ontario. He helped the club reach the playoffs, although he returned to school and was unable to participate in them. He was named a league Second Team All-Star after the season.

In April 2023, Chandler signed with Valour FC of the Canadian Premier League, after joining the club as a pre-season trialist. He made his debut on April 16 in a league match against York United FC and earned his first start on April 19 in a Canadian Championship match against TSS FC Rovers. However, afterwards, he suffered an ACL injury, sidelining him indefinitely.

In 2024, he played with the North Toronto Nitros in League1 Ontario. He was named a league Second Team All-Star.

In October 2024, he signed with the Adelaide Comets in NPL South Australia for the 2025 season.

== Career statistics ==
As of August 27, 2024

| Club | Season | League | | | Playoffs | | Domestic Cup | | Other | | Total | |
| Club | Season | Division | Apps | Goals | Apps | Goals | Apps | Goals | Apps | Goals | Apps | Goals |
|---|---|---|---|---|---|---|---|---|---|---|---|---|
| Manhattan SC | 2021 | USL League Two | 11 | 0 | – | | – | | – | | 11 | 0 |
| Blue Devils FC | 2022 | League1 Ontario | 13 | 0 | 0 | 0 | – | | – | | 13 | 0 |
| Valour FC | 2023 | Canadian Premier League | 1 | 0 | – | | 1 | 0 | – | | 2 | 0 |
| North Toronto Nitros | 2024 | League1 Ontario Premier | 18 | 1 | – | | – | | 4 | 0 | 22 | 1 |
| Career total | | | 43 | 1 | 0 | 0 | 1 | 0 | 4 | 0 | 48 | 1 |
