= Eskander Mzoughi =

Association football player (born 2003

Personal information
- Date of birth: October 12, 2003 (age 23)
- Place of birth: Montreal, Quebec, Canada
- Height: 1.75 m (5 ft 9 in)
- Position: Defender

Youth career
- CS Phénix des Rivières
- OH Leuven

Senior career*
Years	Team	Apps	(Gls)
2023	Valour FC	14	(0)
2024–	AS Soliman	0	(0)

International career
2021	Tunisia U20	5	(0)
- * Club domestic league appearances and goals as of October 6, 2023

Eskander Mzoughi (Arabic: اسكندر مزوغي; born October 12, 2003) is a footballer who plays for Tunisian Ligue Professionnelle 1 club AS Soliman. Born in Canada, he has represented Tunisia at youth international level.

== Early life ==
Mzoughi was born in Montreal and grew up in Quebec City. He began playing youth soccer in Canada at age seven with CS Phénix des Rivières. He moved to Belgium at the age of 10 with his family and soon after joined the youth system of OH Leuven.

== Club career ==
In January 2023, he joined Valour FC of the Canadian Premier League. He made his debut on May 6, 2023 against the HFX Wanderers.

In 2024, he joined Tunisian Ligue Professionnelle 1 club AS Soliman.

== International career ==
Mzoughi was born in Canada to parents of Tunisian descent, and also holds Belgian citizenship, having obtained it during his time in Belgium.

In 2020, he had discussions with the Canadian Soccer Association in regards of a development program in preparation for the 2026 FIFA World Cup and was also invited to a camp with the Canada U20 team, however, the camp was cancelled due to the COVID-19 pandemic.

In May 2021, he was called up to the Tunisia U20 team for the 2021 Arab Cup U-20, but he was injured in the first match and missed the remainder of the tournament. He was also called up for the 2021 UNAF U-20 Tournament, where Tunisia won the tournament. He made five appearances for the side that year.
