= Jonathan Esparza =

American soccer player

Personal information
- Full name: Jonathan Alonzo Esparza
- Date of birth: July 9, 1999 (age 27)
- Place of birth: Chula Vista, California, United States
- Height: 5 ft 9 in (1.75 m)
- Position: Defender

Senior career*
Years	Team	Apps	(Gls)
2018–2019	Tijuana	0	(0)
2018–2019	→ Oaxaca (loan)	5	(0)
2019	→ Celaya (loan)	1	(0)
2020	Irapuato	0	(0)
2021	Chattanooga Red Wolves	25	(0)
2022	Valour FC	1	(0)

International career
2017	United States U18	5	(0)
- * Club domestic league appearances and goals as of October 12, 2022

Jonathan Alonzo Esparza (born July 9, 1999) is an American soccer player who plays as a defender.

== Club career ==
In 2018, he joined Liga MX club Tijuana. He was loaned to Ascenso MX club Oaxaca for the 2018–19 season. He made his debut in a Copa MX match on July 24 against Monarcas Morelia. He made his league debut on August 25 against Cafetaleros de Chiapas. In 2019, he was loaned to Celaya FC also in the Ascenso MX.

In 2020, he joined Mexican third division side Irapuato.

On January 21, 2021, he returned to the United States, signing with the Chattanooga Red Wolves of USL League One.

Exactly one year later, on January 21, 2022, he signed with Canadian Premier League club Valour FC.

== International career ==
He represented the United States U18 at the 2017 Slovakia Cup.

== Career statistics ==
=== Club ===
As of 29 July 2019.

Club	Season	League			Cup		Continental		Other		Total	
Club	Season	Division	Apps	Goals	Apps	Goals	Apps	Goals	Apps	Goals	Apps	Goals
Tijuana	2018–19	Liga MX	0	0	0	0	–		0	0	0	0
Oaxaca (loan)	2018–19	Ascenso MX	5	0	4 (Note: Appearances in the Copa MX)	0	–		0	0	9	0
Career total			5	0	4	0	0	0	0	0	9	0
