= Matteo de Brienne =

Canadian soccer player

Personal information
- Full name: Matteo Camillo Paul de Brienne
- Date of birth: May 22, 2002 (age 24)
- Place of birth: Ottawa, Ontario, Canada
- Height: 1.70 m (5 ft 7 in)
- Position: Left-back

Team information
- Current team: GAIS
- Number: 2

Youth career
- Ottawa South United
- 2016–2020: Vancouver Whitecaps FC

College career
Years	Team	Apps	(Gls)
2021	Carleton Ravens	10	(6)

Senior career*
Years	Team	Apps	(Gls)
2020	Atlético Ottawa	0	(0)
2021	Ottawa South United	1	(0)
2021	FC Manitoba	0	(0)
2022–2023	Valour FC	42	(6)
2024	Atlético Ottawa	26	(0)
2025–	GAIS	36	(1)

International career^{‡}
2026–	Canada B	1	(0)
- * Club domestic league appearances and goals as of August 20, 2026 ‡ National team caps and goals as of January 17, 2026

Matteo Camillo Paul de Brienne (born May 22, 2002) is a Canadian professional soccer player who plays as a left-back for Allsvenskan club GAIS.

== Early life ==
De Brienne began playing youth soccer at age three with Ottawa South United. In 2013, he was invited by the Dallas Texans SC (an affiliate club of Ottawa South United) to attend trials with the Real Madrid Academy in Spain. He played with the Ontario provincial team at the U14 level. In March 2016, he had a week-long trial with English club Crewe Alexandra. In August 2016, he joined the Vancouver Whitecaps Academy.

== University career ==
In September 2021, he began attending Carleton University, where he played for the men's soccer team. He scored six goals in ten appearances, helping the Ravens capture the silver medal at the national tournament. He was named the OUA West Rookie of the Year. De Brienne was also named to the 2021 U Sports All-Rookie Team, as well to the national tournament all-star team. He was also a nominee for the U Sports Lou Bilek Award (Rookie of the Year).

== Club career ==
On July 31, 2020, de Brienne signed his first professional contract with Canadian Premier League side Atlético Ottawa. However, he did not make any appearances for the club that season.

He began the 2021 season with his former youth club Ottawa South United in the third tier Première ligue de soccer du Québec in July. However, a couple of weeks later he signed with FC Manitoba, who participated in the 2021 Summer Series, after withdrawing from the USL League Two season due to the COVID-19 pandemic. While with FC Manitoba, he was invited to train with CPL club Valour FC.

=== Valour FC ===
In January 2022, he initially registered for the 2022 CPL-U Sports Draft, before withdrawing soon after on January 13. Instead, on January 18, 2022, he signed a contract with CPL club Valour FC. He scored his first professional goal on June 15 against Cavalry FC. At the end of the 2023 season, he was nominated for the CPL Best Canadian U-21 Player of the Year award, and eventually won it. After the 2023 season, he chose to depart Valour, after declining an extension offer. Over his two seasons with Valour, he scored six goals in 44 matches, across all competitions.

=== Atletico Ottawa ===
On December 21, 2023, Atlético Ottawa announced the signing of de Brienne for the 2024 campaign, as the player signed a one-year deal with an option for another season. On 13 April 2024, he made his debut in the season opener against York United FC.

=== GAIS ===
On January 6, 2025, De Brienne joined Allsvenskan club GAIS for an undisclosed fee, signing a contract until the end of the 2029 season.

== International career ==
In 2016 and 2017, he attended camps with the Canada U14 and U15 teams respectively.

In January 2026, he was named to the Canada senior team for a training camp and friendly against Guatemala. He appeared in the match against Guatemala, however, as it was designated a B-level friendly, it did not count as an official senior cap.

== Personal life ==
De Brienne is the cousin of current NHL player Matthew Peca.

== Career statistics ==
As of August 20, 2026

Club	Season	League			Playoffs		National cup		Continental		Total	
Club	Season	Division	Apps	Goals	Apps	Goals	Apps	Goals	Apps	Goals	Apps	Goals
Atlético Ottawa	2020	Canadian Premier League	0	0	–		–		–		0	0
Ottawa South United	2021	Première ligue de soccer du Québec	1	0	–		–		–		1	0
Valour FC	2022	Canadian Premier League	22	3	–		1	0	–		23	3
Valour FC	2023	Canadian Premier League	20	3	–		1	0	–		21	3
Valour FC	Total		42	6	0	0	2	0	0	0	45	6
Atlético Ottawa	2024	Canadian Premier League	26	0	2	0	3	0	–		31	0
GAIS	2025	Allsvenskan	21	1	0	0	3	0	0	0	24	1
GAIS	2026	Allsvenskan	15	0	0	0	6	1	0	0	21	1
GAIS	Total		36	1	0	0	9	1	0	0	45	2
Career total			105	7	2	0	14	1	0	0	122	8
