= Rocco Romeo =

Canadian soccer player (born 2000)

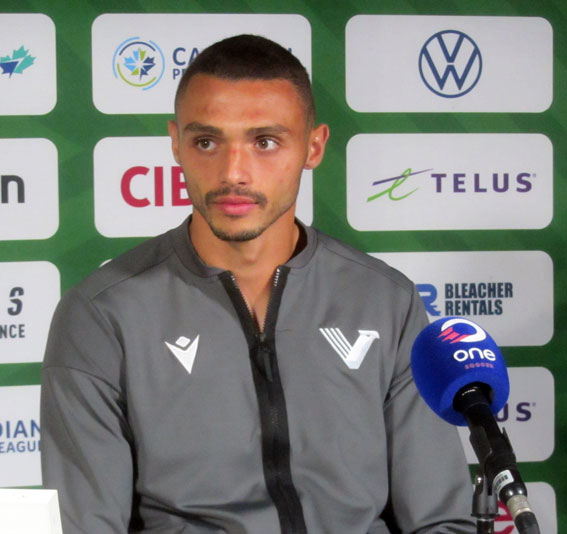
- Romeo in 2023

Personal information
- Full name: Antonio Rocco Romeo
- Date of birth: March 25, 2000 (age 26)
- Place of birth: Toronto, Ontario, Canada
- Height: 1.95 m (6 ft 5 in)
- Position: Centre-back

Team information
- Current team: Brooklyn FC
- Number: 4

Youth career
- Bolton Wanderers SC
- –2014: Woodbridge Strikers
- 2014–2018: Toronto FC

Senior career*
Years	Team	Apps	(Gls)
2016–2018	Toronto FC III	33	(1)
2016–2021	Toronto FC II	25	(1)
2019	→ HB Køge (loan)	8	(0)
2020–2021	Toronto FC	0	(0)
2020–2021	→ HB Køge (loan)	12	(0)
2021	→ Valour FC (loan)	16	(2)
2022	Valour FC	23	(2)
2023–2024	Vancouver FC	48	(2)
2025	Valour FC	17	(0)
2026–	Brooklyn FC	18	(0)

International career^{‡}
2017	Canada U17	1	(0)
2018	Canada U20	3	(0)
- * Club domestic league appearances and goals as of October 31, 2026 ‡ National team caps and goals as of November 10, 2018

Antonio Rocco Romeo (born March 25, 2000) is a Canadian professional soccer player who plays as a centre-back for Brooklyn FC in the USL Championship.

== Early life ==
Born in Toronto, Ontario, Romeo began playing youth soccer with Bolton Wanderers SC, before moving on to the Woodbridge Strikers.

== Club career ==
=== Toronto FC ===
In 2014, Romeo joined the Toronto FC youth system. He played 17 games for Toronto FC III in League1 Ontario during the 2016 season and 15 games during the 2017 season, scoring once against Toronto Skillz FC.

On September 4, 2016, Romeo made his debut for Toronto FC II, the reserve team of Toronto FC, in the United Soccer League against Charlotte Independence. He came on as a 62nd minute substitute for Clément Simonin as Toronto FC II lost 5–1. On September 15, 2017, Romeo signed his first professional contract, joining Toronto FC II on a permanent basis. On January 31, 2019, Danish 1st Division club HB Køge announced that they had signed Romeo on a loan deal until June 30.

On January 21, 2020, Romeo signed a first-team MLS deal with Toronto FC. On August 13, HB Køge announced Romeo had returned to the club once again on loan. He scored his first goal for Køge on October 6 in a cup match against Bispebjerg BK, also picking up a red card later in the same match.

=== Canadian Premier League ===
On July 30, 2021, he was sent on loan from Toronto FC to Valour FC of the Canadian Premier League. The next day he made his debut for Valour against FC Edmonton. In the next match on August 4, he scored his first goal for Valour against Pacific FC. Upon completion of the 2021 season, Romeo's option for the 2022 season was not picked up by Toronto, making him a free agent.

In February 2022, Romeo signed with Valour FC on a permanent deal.

Following the expiration of his contract with Valour, on January 16, 2023, Romeo joined expansion side Vancouver FC. He scored his first goal on April 18, 2024, in a victory over the HFX Wanderers.

In January 2025, he returned to Valour FC on a one-year contract with an option for 2026.

=== Brooklyn FC ===
In February 2026, he signed with Brooklyn FC in the USL Championship.

== International career ==
Romeo was born in Canada and is of Italian descent.

Romeo has represented Canada at the 2017 CONCACAF U-17 Championship. On October 24, 2018, he was named to the Canadian U20 squad for the 2018 CONCACAF U-20 Championship. Romeo was named to the Canadian U-23 provisional roster for the 2020 CONCACAF Men's Olympic Qualifying Championship on February 26, 2020, however, the tournament was soon after postponed indefinitely due to the COVID-19 pandemic.

== Career statistics ==
As of June 21, 2026

Club	Season	League			Domestic Cup		League Cup		Continental		Total	
Club	Season	Division	Apps	Goals	Apps	Goals	Apps	Goals	Apps	Goals	Apps	Goals
Toronto FC III	2016	League1 Ontario	17	0	—		1	0	—		18	0
Toronto FC III	2017	League1 Ontario	15	1	—		2	0	—		17	1
Toronto FC III	2018	League1 Ontario	1	0	—		0	0	—		1	0
Toronto FC III	Total		33	1	0	0	3	0	0	0	36	1
Toronto FC II	2016	USL	1	0	—		—		—		1	0
Toronto FC II	2017	USL	2	0	—		—		—		2	0
Toronto FC II	2018	USL	12	0	—		—		—		12	0
Toronto FC II	2019	USL League One	10	1	—		—		—		10	1
Toronto FC II	Total		25	1	0	0	0	0	0	0	25	1
HB Køge (loan)	2018–19	Danish 1st Division	8	0	0	0	—		—		8	0
HB Køge (loan)	2020–21	Danish 1st Division	12	0	2	1	—		—		14	1
HB Køge (loan)	Total		20	0	2	1	0	0	0	0	22	1
Valour FC (loan)	2021	Canadian Premier League	16	2	2	0	—		—		18	2
Valour FC	2022	Canadian Premier League	23	2	1	0	—		—		24	2
Valour FC	Total		39	4	3	0	0	0	0	0	42	4
Vancouver FC	2023	Canadian Premier League	25	0	1	0	—		—		26	0
Vancouver FC	2024	Canadian Premier League	23	2	1	0	—		—		24	2
Vancouver FC	Total		48	2	2	0	0	0	0	0	50	2
Valour FC	2025	Canadian Premier League	17	0	3	1	—		—		20	1
Brooklyn FC	USL Championship	2026	6	0	0	0	1	0	0	0	7	0
Career total			186	8	10	2	4	0	0	0	200	9

== Honours ==
Toronto FC III

- League1 Ontario Second Team All Star: 2016, 2017
