= Jared Ulloa =

Peruvian footballer (born 2002)

Personal information
- Full name: Jared Leonardo Ulloa Bazán
- Date of birth: 8 June 2002 (age 24)
- Place of birth: Piura, Peru
- Height: 1.75 m (5 ft 9 in)
- Position: Winger

Team information
- Current team: Unión Santo Domingo

Youth career
- Academia César Antonio UCV
- 2015–2016: Academia San Antonio de Piura
- 2017–2020: Sporting Cristal

Senior career*
Years	Team	Apps	(Gls)
2021–2022	Sporting Cristal	0	(0)
2021	→ Valour FC (loan)	22	(0)
2022	→ Cusco (loan)	0	(0)
2022	Cusco	16	(1)
2023	Valour FC	26	(1)
2024	Unión Huaral	0	(0)
2024–2025	Alianza Lima II	0	(0)
2025	→ Deportivo Coopsol (loan)	9	(0)
2025–2026	Comerciantes	3	(0)
2026–	Unión Santo Domingo	0	(0)

International career
2017	Peru U15		
- * Club domestic league appearances and goals as of 12 March 2026

Jared Leonardo Ulloa Bazán (born 8 June 2002) is a Peruvian professional footballer who plays as a winger for Liga 3 club Unión Santo Domingo.

== Early life ==
Ulloa began playing with the Academia César Antonio UCV at age 13 and then joined the Academia San Antonio de Piura in 2015. In 2017, he joined the youth system of Sporting Cristal, where he won two Torneo de Reservas titles and the Torneo Centenario.

== Club career ==
In 2021, he signed a professional contract with Sporting Cristal. Shortly thereafter, he went on loan to Valour FC of the Canadian Premier League. He made his professional debut for Valour on June 27, 2021 against Forge FC.

In January 2022, he was sent on loan to Cusco FC of the Peruvian Segunda División. However, in March 2022, he terminated his contract with Sporting Cristal by mutual consent, and joined Cusco permanently. With Cusco, he won the second division title in 2022.

In February 2023, he returned to Valour FC on a permanent contract. Valour had been interested in bringing him back the year prior for the 2022 season, however, he was deemed to be unavailable. He scored his first goal on September 8, 2023 against York United FC.

In January 2024, he returned to Peru, signing with Unión Huaral in Liga 2.

In March 2025, he signed with Deportivo Coopsol.

== International career ==
Ulloa was born in Peru to a Canadian father, and is eligible for both national teams.

In 2017, he played for the Peru U15 national team.
