= Stefan Cebara =

Canadian soccer player

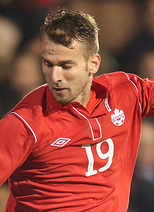
- Cebara with Canada in 2013

Personal information
- Date of birth: 12 April 1991 (age 35)
- Place of birth: Zadar, SR Croatia, SFR Yugoslavia
- Height: 1.88 m (6 ft 2 in)
- Positions: Right-back; center back

Team information
- Current team: Rayong
- Number: 14

Youth career
- Windsor FC Nationals
- 2009: Riverside Rebels
- 2009–2010: Rad Belgrade

Senior career*
Years	Team	Apps	(Gls)
2010–2012	Zalaegerszeg	2	(0)
2012–2013	Celje	17	(0)
2015–2016	ViOn Zlaté Moravce	31	(2)
2017	Utenis Utena	8	(0)
2017–2018	Vojvodina	5	(1)
2020–2022	Valour FC	54	(3)
2023–2024	Europa	4	(0)
2024	El Ejido	5	(0)
2025–	Rayong	10	(0)

International career^{‡}
2011	Canada U20	15	(8)
2013	Canada	5	(0)
- * Club domestic league appearances and goals as of 9 January 2026 ‡ National team caps and goals as of 19 June 2017

Stefan Cebara (pronounced [stěfaːn tsěbara]; born 12 April 1991) is a professional soccer player for Rayong in the Thai League 1. Born in Yugoslavia, he played for the Canada national team.

== Early life ==
Cebara was born in the city of Zadar to a Serb father Miroslav and a Croatian mother Mirjana and spent his early years in the town of Benkovac. He first moved to Belgrade with his family when he was four, and then to Canada at the age of six. At the age of nine, he started playing with Windsor FC Nationals. He grew up competing in soccer, basketball, hockey, volleyball, and track and field. Growing up, he attended Riverside Secondary School in Canada.

== Club career ==
=== Early career ===
Cebara played for the Windsor FC Nationals before moving to Serbia to join Rad Belgrade. He played with their youth team, although he also had the chance to play a few exhibition matches with the main team alongside future Canada national team goalkeeper Milan Borjan.

=== Zalaegerszeg ===
After a year in Belgrade, he moved to Hungary and signed with Zalaegerszeg. He scored in his first-team debut on 2 March 2011, in a Hungarian Cup match against Vasas, however as the youngest player on the team, he divided his time between the first team and the reserve team. Cebara made two appearances in the Hungarian Championship before leaving to join the Canadian U20 team in their World Cup qualifiers. After his return to the club, he began experiencing financial difficulties and problems cancelling his contract, so he spent the following six months inactive.

=== Celje ===
In August 2012, he went on a ten-day trial period at Italian club Udinese; however, a month later, on 11 September, he signed a two-year contract with Slovenian side NK Celje. He made his debut for Celje on 16 September 2012, in a Slovenian First League game against Koper.

=== Zlaté Moravce ===
In February 2015, Cebara was reported to have signed with ViOn Zlaté Moravce of the Fortuna Liga.

=== Vojvodina ===
After spending six months with Lithuanian A Lyga club Utenis Utena, Cebara signed a two-year deal with Serbian club Vojvodina Novi Sad on 10 July 2017.

=== Valour FC ===
On 3 April 2020, Cebara signed with Canadian Premier League side Valour FC. He made his debut for Valour on August 16 against Cavalry FC. In December 2022, Valour announced that Cebara would be departing the club. He captained the club while playing for them.

=== Spain ===
Following his departure from Winnipeg, he returned to the European circuit to play in the Gibraltar Football League with Europa. In 2024, he joined El Ejido in the Spanish Tercera Federación.

=== Thailand ===
In 2025, he joined Rayong in the Thai League 1.

== International career ==
Cebara was 19 when he made his debut in the Canadian youth program in 2011 with coach Valerio Gazzola. He represented the Canada national under-20 team at the 2011 CONCACAF U-20 Championship.

On 14 March 2013, Cebara received his first call up by the Canada national team for friendlies against Japan and Belarus. He made his first appearance on 22 March as a second half sub for Kyle Bekker during a 2–1 defeat to Japan.
