= Kevin Rendón =

Colombian footballer (born 1993)

Personal information
- Full name: Kevin Camilo Rendón Guerrero
- Date of birth: 8 January 1993 (age 33)
- Place of birth: Tumaco, Colombia
- Height: 1.82 m (6 ft 0 in)
- Position: Midfielder

Team information
- Current team: Deportivo Pasto
- Number: 8

Senior career*
Years	Team	Apps	(Gls)
2010–2014	Deportivo Pasto	44+	(8+)
2013	→ Estudiantes de La Plata (loan)	0	(0)
2015	Millonarios	13	(0)
2016–2018	Patriotas Boyacá	41	(4)
2018	Leones	8	(0)
2019–2021	Deportivo Pasto	40	(4)
2022–2023	Valour FC	20	(0)
2024–	Deportivo Pasto	14	(1)
- * Club domestic league appearances and goals as of 12 December 2025

Kevin Camilo Rendón Guerrero (born 8 January 1993) is a Colombian professional footballer who plays for Colombian club Deportivo Pasto in the Categoría Primera A.

== Early life ==
Rendón is the son of former Colombian footballer Carlos Rendón, who is the top goalscorer in Deportivo Pasto with 42 goals. He began playing youth football with Deportivo Pasto. In 2011, he served as captain of Deportivo Pasto's U20 side, finishing as the team's leading scorer.

== Club career ==
He made his debut for the Deportivo Pasto first team in a Copa Colombia match in 2010. He made his league debut in the Categoría Primera B on 28 February 2010, scoring against Atlético de la Sabana. He helped them win the Primera B title in 2011, earning promotion to the first tier Categoría Primera A. In January 2013, he joined Argentinian club Estudiantes de La Plata on a one-year loan. In May 2013, after not making any appearances with Estudiantes (only appearing a few reserve team matches, he terminated his loan early and returned to Deportivo Pasto. In November 2014, he terminated his contract with Pasto over unpaid wages.

For the 2015 season, he joined Millonarios. He left the club in December after the expiry of his contract.

In January 2016, he joined Patriotas Boyacá.

In July 2018, he joined Leones. He departed the club in December 2021, after they were relegated to the Categoría Primera B.

In January 2019, he returned to his former club Deportivo Pasto. In December 2021, he left the club.

On 31 May 2022, he joined Canadian Premier League club Valour FC. He made his debut on 10 July against HFX Wanderers FC.

In January 2024, he again returned to Deportivo Pasto.

== International career ==
He received callups to training camps for the Colombia U20 in 2012 and 2013.
