= Moses Dyer =

New Zealand footballer (born 1997)

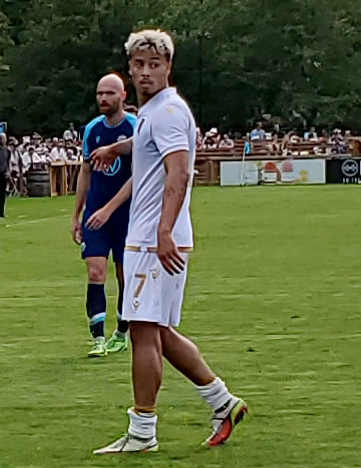
- Dyer with Valour in 2022

Personal information
- Full name: Moses John Dyer
- Date of birth: 21 March 1997 (age 29)
- Place of birth: Palmerston North, New Zealand
- Height: 1.78 m (5 ft 10 in)
- Positions: Midfielder; forward

Team information
- Current team: Phnom Penh Crown
- Number: 10

Youth career
- –2014: Auckland City

Senior career*
Years	Team	Apps	(Gls)
2014–2015	Wanderers SC	9	(0)
2015–2016	Onehunga Sports		
2016–2017	Eastern Suburbs	17	(5)
2017	Northcote City	3	(1)
2017–2018	Eastern Suburbs	15	(4)
2018	Manukau United	8	(3)
2018–2019	Florø	26	(7)
2020–2022	Valour FC	54	(19)
2023–2024	FC Tulsa	29	(4)
2024	Vancouver FC	13	(4)
2024	→ Pacific FC (loan)	10	(4)
2025	Galway United	20	(10)
2025–	Phnom Penh Crown	34	(17)

International career^{‡}
2015–2017	New Zealand U20	15	(3)
2015	New Zealand U23	4	(0)
2015–	New Zealand	14	(1)
- * Club domestic league appearances and goals as of 9 November 2026 ‡ National team caps and goals as of 19 October 2026

Moses John Dyer (born 21 March 1997) is a New Zealand professional footballer who plays for Cambodian Premier League club Phnom Penh Crown and the New Zealand national team.

== Club career ==
=== Wanderers SC ===
In September 2014, Dyer signed with New Zealand Premiership side Wanderers SC. Dyer made his competitive debut for Wanderers in the opening round of the 2014–15 ASB Premiership against Waitakere United in a 3–2 loss. That season, he made a total of nine league appearances for Wanderers.

=== Eastern Suburbs ===
In 2016, Dyer signed with Eastern Suburbs, making seventeen appearances that season and scoring five goals.

=== Northcote City ===
In mid 2017, Dyer signed for NPL 2 side Northcote City. Following his participation at the U-20 World Cup, Dyer trialed with several European sides including Arendal, Vejle Boldklub and Crewe Alexandra.

=== Second spell at Eastern Suburbs ===
In 2017, Dyer returned to Eastern Suburbs and made fifteen appearances that season, scoring four goals. In the last league game of the season, Dyer was sent off in the closing minutes for grabbing a Canterbury United opponent and dragging him to the ground.

=== Manukau United ===
On 30 March 2018, Dyer signed for Kevin Fallon's newly formed Manukau United in New Zealand's NRFL Premier.

=== Florø ===
On 25 July 2018, Dyer signed with Norwegian First Division side Florø SK. That season, he made seven appearances, scoring one goals as Florø was relegated to the Second Division. The following season, Dyer made nineteen league appearances, scoring six goals.

=== Valour FC ===
On 14 February 2020, Dyer signed with Canadian Premier League side Valour FC. He made his debut on August 16 against Cavalry FC. After the 2021 CPL season, Valour announced they had exercised Dyer's contract option, keeping him at the club through 2022. In December 2022, Valour announced that Dyer would be departing the club.

=== FC Tulsa ===
On 22 December 2022, Dyer signed with USL Championship side FC Tulsa.

On 15 March 2024, FC Tulsa announced the mutual termination of Dyer's contract.

=== Vancouver FC ===
In March 2024, Dyer returned to the Canadian Premier League, joining Vancouver FC. In August 2024, he was loaned to Pacific FC for the remainder of 2024 in a loan swap, with Ayman Sellouf heading to Vancouver FC on loan for the same duration.

=== Galway United ===
On 12 January 2025, Dyer signed for League of Ireland Premier Division club Galway United. He was named League of Ireland Player of the Month for April 2025. He scored 10 goals in 20 appearances before Derry City met the buyout clause in his contract in June 2025, but he declined their contract offer. Dyer finished fifth top goal scorer in the Premier Division that season, despite leaving halfway through.

=== Phnom Penh Crown ===
On 19 July 2025, it was announced that Dyer had signed for Cambodian Premier League side Phnom Penh Crown after they had met the €60,000 buyout clause in his Galway United contract.

== International career ==
Dyer was born in New Zealand and is of Polynesian descent. Dyer was called up to the New Zealand senior team for a friendly against South Korea as a replacement for Ryan Thomas who had pulled out of the game due to injury He was substituted on in the second half, as New Zealand succumbed to a late goal to lose 1–0.

Following the South Korea friendly, New Zealand U-20 coach Darren Bazeley named several Under-20 eligible players, including Dyer for a 2-match tour of Uzbekistan against the Uzbekistan U-20s in preparation for the 2015 FIFA U-20 World Cup which was held in New Zealand. During this game, he came on as a second-half substitute in their first game, which New Zealand lost 1–0.

Dyer was a member of the New Zealand squad at the 2017 FIFA U-20 World Cup.

== Career statistics ==
=== Club ===
As of match played 22 March 2026

Appearances and goals by club, season and competition
Club	Season	League			National Cup		Continental		Other		Total	
Club	Season	Division	Apps	Goals	Apps	Goals	Apps	Goals	Apps	Goals	Apps	Goals
Wanderers SC	2014–15	NZ Premiership	9	0	—		—		—		9	0
Eastern Suburbs	2016–17	NZ Premiership	17	5	—		—		—		17	5
Northcote City	2017	NPL Victoria 2	3	1	—		—		—		3	1
Eastern Suburbs	2017–18	NZ Premiership	15	4	—		—		—		15	4
Manukau United	2018	NRFL Premier	8	3	0	0	—		—		8	3
Florø	2018	1. divisjon	7	1	—		—		—		7	1
Florø	2019	2. divisjon	19	6	1	2	—		—		20	8
Florø	Total		26	7	1	2	—		—		27	9
Valour FC	2020	Canadian Premier League	6	1	—		—		—		6	1
Manukau United	2021	NZ National League	4	3	0	0	—		—		4	3
Valour FC	2021	Canadian Premier League	27	9	2	0	—		—		29	9
Valour FC	2022	Canadian Premier League	21	9	1	0	—		—		22	9
Valour FC	Total		48	18	3	0	—		—		51	18
FC Tulsa	2023	USL Championship	29	4	1	0	—		—		30	4
Vancouver FC	2024	Canadian Premier League	13	4	1	0	—		—		14	4
Pacific FC (loan)	2024	Canadian Premier League	10	4	—		—		1 (Note: Appearance in Canadian Premier League playoffs)	0	11	4
Galway United	2025	LOI Premier Division	20	10	0	0	—		—		20	10
Phnom Penh Crown	2025–26	Cambodian Premier League	22	12	0	0	6 (Note: Appearance in AFC Challenge League)	9	1 (Note: Appearance in Cambodian Super Cup)	0	28	21
Phnom Penh Crown	2026–27	Cambodian Premier League	0	0	0	0	0	0	—		0	0
Phnom Penh Crown	Total											
Career total			230	76	6	2	6	9	2	0	244	87

=== International ===
As of match played 24 September 2026

Appearances and goals by national team and year
National team	Year	Apps	Goals
New Zealand
New Zealand	2015	2	0
New Zealand	2016	6	0
New Zealand	2017	2	0
New Zealand	2018	1	1
New Zealand	2026	1	0
Total		12	1

==== International goals ====
Scores and results list New Zealand's goal tally first.

List of international goals scored by Moses Dyer
No.	Date	Venue	Opponent	Score	Result	Competition
1.	7 June 2018	Mumbai Football Arena, Mumbai, India	India	2–1	2–1	2018 Intercontinental Cup
