= Walter Ponce =

Chilean footballer (born 1998)

Personal information
- Full name: Walter Benjamín Ponce Gallardo
- Date of birth: 4 March 1998 (age 28)
- Place of birth: Santiago, Chile
- Height: 1.83 m (6 ft 0 in)
- Position: Forward

Youth career
- Palestino
- 2013–2016: Udinese
- 2015: → Unión Española (loan)
- 2015–2016: → Palestino (loan)
- 2016: → Granada (loan)

Senior career*
Years	Team	Apps	(Gls)
2015–2016	Udinese	0	(0)
2015–2016	→ Palestino (loan)	3	(0)
2016	→ Granada B (loan)	–	(–)
2017–2019	Universidad de Concepción	34	(5)
2020–2021	Deportes La Serena	19	(1)
2021	Barnechea	8	(0)
2022–2023	Valour FC	42	(6)
2024	Unión La Calera	25	(2)
2025	Cobreloa	13	(1)

International career^{‡}
2015	Chile U17	2	(0)
- * Club domestic league appearances and goals as of 23 January 2026 ‡ National team caps and goals as of 1 February 2021

Walter Benjamín Ponce Gallardo (born 4 March 1998) is a Chilean professional footballer who plays as a forward.

== Early life ==
He played youth football in the system of Chilean clubs Palestino and Unión Española and the Spanish club Granada. In 2013, Italian club Udinese, who shared the same owners as Granada, purchased 50% of his economic playing rights.

== Club career ==
He began his senior career with Chilean Primera División club Palestino, making his professional debut in 2015 at age seventeen. He made his debut in a Copa Chile match on 16 July 2015 against Unión Española. Afterwards, he was sent on loan to Spanish club Granada B.

In July 2017, he signed with Universidad de Concepción.

In December 2019, he signed with La Serena for the 2020 season.

In March 2021, he signed with Barnechea in the Primera B de Chile.

In January 2022, he signed with Canadian Premier League club Valour FC. However, due to visa issues, he was unable to join the team until May. He scored his first goal on June 15 against Cavalry FC.

In 2024, Ponce returned to Chile and joined Unión La Calera. The next year, he switched to Cobreloa.

== International career ==
At the 2015 FIFA U-17 World Cup, he made two appearances for Chile U17.
