= Phillip Dos Santos =

Canadian soccer coach (born 1978)

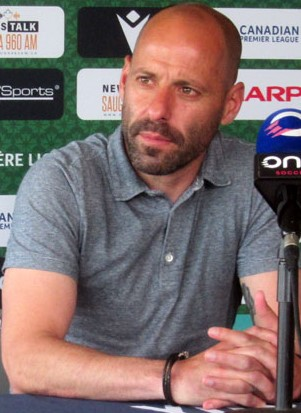
- Dos Santos in 2022

Personal information
- Full name: Phillip Dos Santos
- Date of birth: August 13, 1978 (age 48)
- Place of birth: Montreal, Quebec, Canada

Managerial career
- Years: Team
- 2015: Ottawa Fury FC (assistant)
- 2016: Fort Lauderdale Strikers (assistant)
- 2017: San Francisco Deltas (assistant)
- 2018: Indy Eleven (assistant)
- 2018–2021: Vancouver Whitecaps FC (assistant)
- 2021–2025: Valour FC
- 2026–: Detroit City (assistant)

Phillip Dos Santos is a Canadian soccer coach. He is currently the assistant coach of Detroit City FC of the USL Championship.

== Coaching career ==
=== Early career ===
From 2011 to 2014, Dos Santos served in various roles for the youth sides of the Canada men's national soccer team. He later served as an assistant coach for Ottawa Fury FC, Fort Lauderdale Strikers, San Francisco Deltas, Indy Eleven, and Vancouver Whitecaps FC while his brother Marc Dos Santos was head coach.

=== Valour FC ===
On September 23, 2021, Dos Santos was named general manager and head coach of Valour FC of the Canadian Premier League.

=== Detroit City ===
Following the folding of Winnipeg, he joined Detroit City's coaching staff as an assistant coach under Danny Dichio.

== Coaching record ==
As of October 23, 2024

Team	From	To	Record								Ref.
Team	From	To	M	W	D	L	GF	GA	GD	Win %	Ref.
Valour FC	September 23, 2021	November 21, 2025	97	26	25	46	111	143	−32	26.80	
Total			97	26	25	46	111	143	−32	26.80	—

== Personal life ==
Dos Santos was born in Montreal and moved to Portugal at age 10. He is fluent in English, French, Portuguese and Spanish. He holds a UEFA PRO coaching licence.
