= Andy Baquero =

Cuban footballer (born 1994)

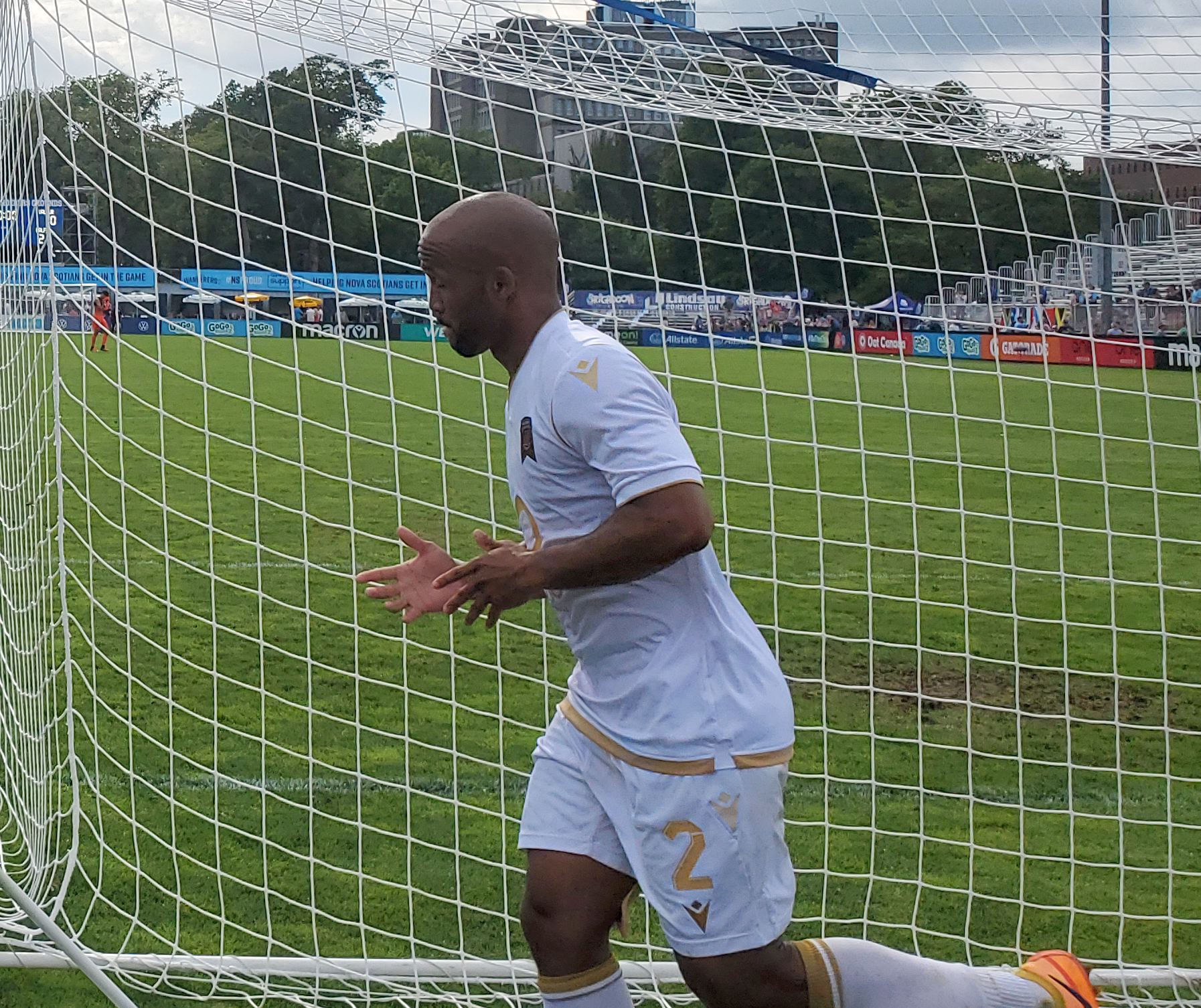
- Baquero with Valour in 2022

Personal information
- Full name: Andy Baquero Ruiz
- Date of birth: 17 August 1994 (age 32)
- Place of birth: Havana, Cuba
- Height: 1.72 m (5 ft 8 in)
- Positions: Midfielder; right-back

Team information
- Current team: Scarborough SC

Senior career*
Years	Team	Apps	(Gls)
2013–2017	La Habana	26	(7)
2017	Villa Clara	9	(0)
2018	La Habana	6	(1)
2018	Pinar del Río		(2)
2019	La Habana		(3)
2019	Delfines del Este	9	(3)
2021–2023	Valour FC	74	(2)
2024–2025	Vaughan Azzurri	29	(6)
2025–	Scarborough SC		

International career^{‡}
2011	Cuba U17	3	(0)
2012–13	Cuba U20	13	(1)
2014	Cuba U21	4	(0)
2014–2019	Cuba	29	(5)
2016–2019	Cuba (futsal)		
- * Club domestic league appearances and goals as of September 1, 2024 ‡ National team caps and goals as of 26 June 2021

Andy Baquero Ruiz (born 17 August 1994) is a Cuban professional footballer who plays for Scarborough SC in the Canadian Soccer League. He previously played for the Cuba national team and Cuba national futsal team until his defection in 2019. He plays as a midfielder and a right back.

== Early life ==
In his youth, Baquero did karate and later baseball, before switching to football at age nine.

== Club career ==
=== Early career ===
Baquero began his professional career at 18 with La Habana, where he played six seasons across two stints, while also having brief tenures with Villa Clara and Pinar del Río.

In 2019, he was granted permission to leave Cuba and go to the Dominican Republic, where he went on trial with Atlántico FC, before signing with Delfines del Este of the Liga Dominicana de Fútbol for a half season, scoring three goals and adding two assists in nine appearances. He had previously received an offer from A.D. Chalatenango of the Primera División de Fútbol de El Salvador on a ten-month contract; however, it was rejected by the Football Association of Cuba, due to concerns about the intermediary who sent the offer. In total, he had 4 contract offers that were rejected.

=== Canada ===
After his defection from Cuba to Canada, he began to work in construction, but also began to train with Vaughan Azzurri of League1 Ontario and was set to join them for their 2020 season; however, the season was cancelled due to the COVID-19 pandemic. Ahead of the 2021 season, he went on trial with Canadian Premier League side Valour FC. In June 2021, Baquero signed with the club. In his first season, he made 23 appearances for the side, playing the fourth-most minutes on the team. In January 2022, he re-signed with the club. Although the club had held a club option on his contract for 2022, they agreed to a new contract to retain him for 2023 as well.

In 2024, he began playing with Vaughan Azzurri in League1 Ontario.

In 2025, he joined Scarborough SC in the Canadian Soccer League. Baquero helped Scarborough secure a playoff berth by winning the regular season title. In the first round of the playoffs, he scored a goal against Aeem Canada FC, and the team advanced to the finals. In the championship final, he scored the winning goal against the Serbian White Eagles. Baquero rejoined Scarborough in 2026, where he scored two goals against the Serbs in the first leg of the championship final. Scarborough would win the championship in the second leg.

== International career ==
Baquero has played in the 2011 CONCACAF U-17 Championship, 2013 CONCACAF U-20 Championship, 2013 FIFA U-20 World Cup, and the 2014 Central American and Caribbean Games. In June 2015, he scored a goal in a friendly hosted in Cuba against the North American Soccer League club team New York Cosmos.

In 2016, he was recruited to join the Cuba national futsal team.

On 7 September 2019, following a match in Toronto, Canada, in the 2019–20 CONCACAF Nations League against Canada, Baquero defected from Cuba along with teammate Alejandro Portal and settled in Canada. As a result of his defection, he would be banned from representing the national team and from returning to Cuba (where the rest of his family was) for eight years until 2027. In November 2023, he was able to reunite with his mother, whom he had been unable to see due to his defection, when she came to Canada.

== Personal life ==
Baquero is also a musician, releasing music under his stage name AB2. In 2020, he was nominated by the Latin Awards Canada for the Breakthrough Artist of the Year in Canada. At the 2022 Latin Awards Canada, his song "Garantizo" was nominated in the Best Urban Pop Fusion Song and Best Music Video categories (winning the Best Urban Pop Fusion Song honour).

Baquero is a Canadian permanent resident.

== Career statistics ==
=== International goals ===
Scores and results list Cuba's goal tally first.

No.	Date	Venue	Opponent	Score	Result	Competition
1.	29 August 2018	Wildey Astro Turf, Bridgetown, Barbados	Barbados	2–0	2–0	Friendly
2.	8 September 2018	Estadio Pedro Marrero, Havana, Cuba	Turks and Caicos Islands	3–0	11–0	2019–20 CONCACAF Nations League qualification
3.	8 September 2018	Estadio Pedro Marrero, Havana, Cuba	Turks and Caicos Islands	5–0	11–0	2019–20 CONCACAF Nations League qualification
4.	29 September 2018	Estadio Pedro Marrero, Havana, Cuba	Cayman Islands	?–0	5–0	Friendly
5.	25 February 2019	Estadio Pedro Marrero, Havana, Cuba	Bermuda	?–?	2–2	Friendly

== Honors ==
Scarborough SC

- CSL Championship: 2025, 2026
- Canadian Soccer League Regular Season: 2025
