= Valour FC =

Canadian professional soccer club in Winnipeg (2019–2025)

Valour
- Full name: Valour Football Club
- Founded: May 6, 2017; 9 years ago
- Dissolved: November 21, 2025; 11 months ago
- Stadium: Princess Auto Stadium, Winnipeg
- Capacity: 33,000
- Owner(s): Winnipeg Football Club (community ownership)
- President and CEO: Wade Miller
- League: Canadian Premier League
- 2025: Regular season: 6th Playoffs: Did not qualify
- Website: www.cplsoccer.com/valourfc
Home colours	Away colours

Valour FC was a Canadian professional soccer club in Winnipeg, Manitoba. The club competed in the Canadian Premier League from 2019 to 2025, playing its home matches at Princess Auto Stadium.

The team was community owned through the Winnipeg Football Club.

== History ==
On May 6, 2017, Winnipeg was one of two cities accepted by the Canadian Soccer Association for professional club membership when the Canadian Premier League was unanimously approved. It was confirmed that Canadian Football League clubs the Winnipeg Blue Bombers and the Hamilton Tiger-Cats were behind the ownership groups. Wade Miller, CEO of the Winnipeg Football Club, was named as the club's president.

In May 2018, it was reported that the club would be called Valour FC. On June 6, 2018, the club was officially unveiled as the fourth team to join the Canadian Premier League. As well as confirming its place in the league for the 2019 launch season, the club also revealed its crest, colours and branding. On June 26, the club named Rob Gale as the first head coach and general manager.

In the overall standings, Valour ranked 6th of 7 teams in the inaugural 2019 season, and then 6th of 8 teams in the pandemic-abridged 2020 season. In the 2021 season, Valour's home stadium IG Field hosted the league's centralized bubble where each team played their first eight games of the season behind closed doors. On September 23, 2021, while in 5th place, Valour FC sacked head coach Rob Gale and named Phillip Dos Santos as his replacement. Despite a late push, Valour remained in 5th place at the end of the season, missing the playoffs by one point.

In 2022, Valour finished with 37 points (their highest-ever point total) but still finished 5th in the league and missed the playoffs by nine points. Valour finished at or near the bottom of the league's standing for each of the next three seasons, failing to record more than 28 points (1.00 PPG) in each of them. The club was also unsuccessful in the Canadian Championship tournament during this time and in 2023, earned the unfortunate distinction of being the first professional team to be knocked out of the tournament by a semi-pro team.

Valour FC suspended operations following the 2025 season. While Wade Miller explained that not enough fans were attending games to justify continued investment by the Winnipeg Football Club, others, including Rob Gale, contended that the team had been mismanaged, citing limited investment, staffing, and community engagement. The Winnipeg Football Club later announced that Valour had cost $4.2 million over the course of its existence.

== Stadium ==
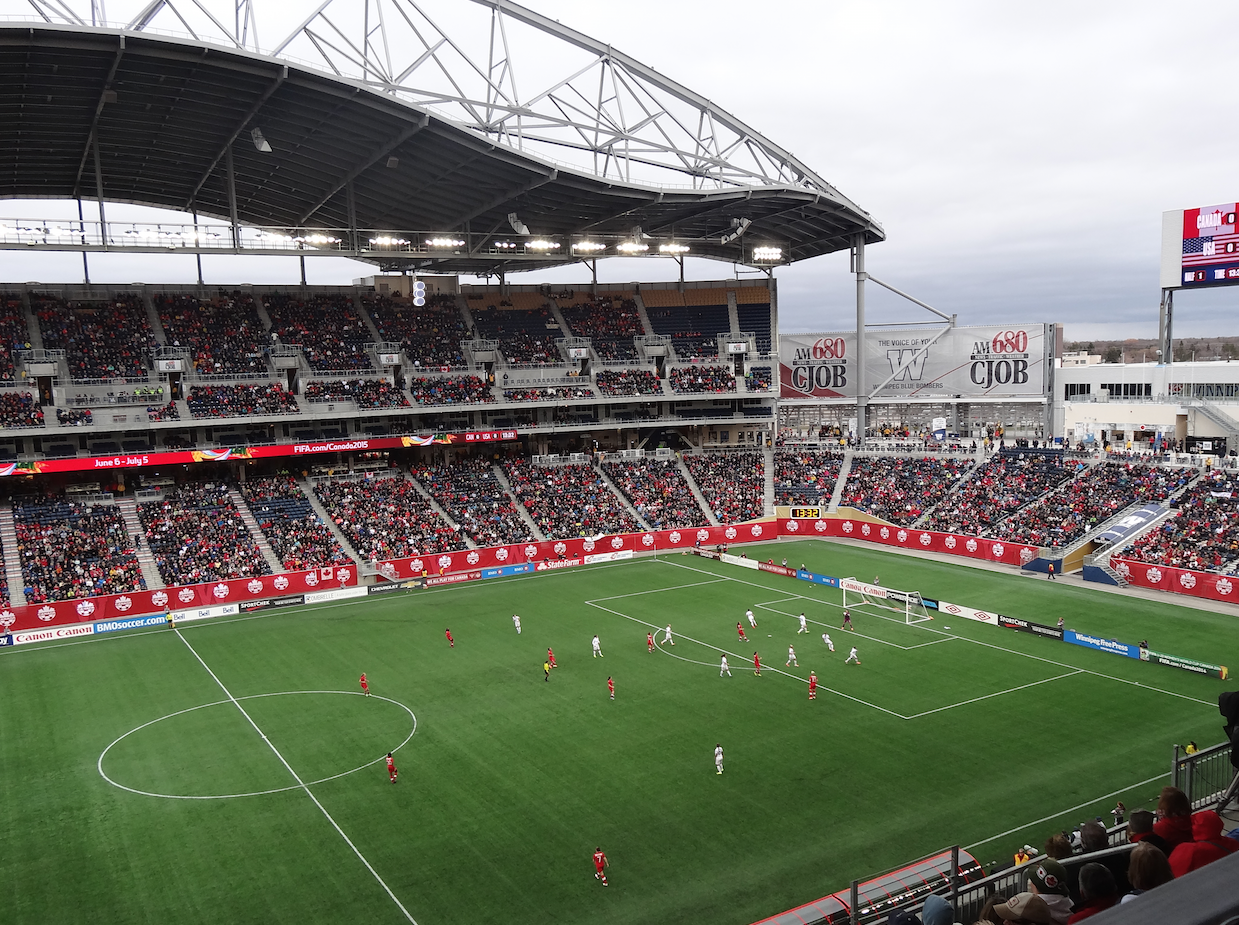
The Princess Auto Stadium, the home of Valour FC, during a soccer match

The club played its home games at Princess Auto Stadium, a 33,234-seat Canadian football stadium. The stadium opened in 2013 on the University of Manitoba campus next to University Stadium. The stadium is also used by the Winnipeg Blue Bombers and the University of Manitoba Bisons football team.

== Crest and colours ==
The club's identity was heavily linked to the story of Winnipeg's Valour Road, and named to recognize Corporal Leo Clarke, Sergeant-Major Frederick William Hall, and Lieutenant Robert Shankland, who all lived on the same street and received the Victoria Cross for acts of bravery during the First World War.

The letter "V" in the centre of the crest emulates a folded medal ribbon and also represents the meeting of the Red River and Assiniboine River in Winnipeg. The right side of the "V" creates a "W" for Winnipeg, and the circle under the "V" is in the shape of the Victoria Cross medal. The wheat at the top of the crest represents Manitoba's agricultural industry.

The official club colours were maroon, gold and black (branded by the club as "Valour maroon," "wheat gold," and "earth black"). These colours symbolize the ribbon of the Victoria Cross and the wheat fields and soil of the Canadian Prairies.

== Youth ==
On August 8, 2018, Valour FC Elite Girls (formerly the Manitoba Blizzard) was founded to give girls in Winnipeg an opportunity to travel to college showcases in Canada and the United States, while getting educated on the recruiting process. The team was led by Head Coach Jim Zinko and Manager Trevor Kidd. Training began in the fall, while the Valour FC Elite Girls competition season ran from late November into April.

== Club culture ==
The club's mascot leaned heavily on imagery of the Victoria Cross, being a lion named 'Vic'. He wore the club's colours on a t-shirt, shorts, and wristbands.

Red River Rising Supporters group first met at Nicolino's Restaurant in January 2017, before a Winnipeg team was announced. The group met regularly in anticipation of an eventual Winnipeg team and now occupy section 144 at Princess Auto Stadium. The section was known as The Trench.

== Players and staff ==
=== Head coaches ===
As of November 21, 2025

Coach	Nation	Tenure	Record				
Coach	Nation	Tenure	G	W	D	L	Win %
Rob Gale	England	June 26, 2018 – September 23, 2021	57	18	8	31	31.58
Phillip Dos Santos	Canada	September 23, 2021 – November 21, 2025	128	35	30	63	27.34

=== Club captains ===
Years	Name	Nation
2019	Jordan Murrell	Canada
2019	Skylar Thomas	Canada
2020	Dylan Carreiro	Canada
2020–2022	Daryl Fordyce	Northern Ireland
2021–2023	Andrew Jean-Baptiste	Haiti
2024–2025	Raphael Ohin	Ghana

== Records ==
=== Year-by-year ===
Season	League												Playoffs	CC	Continental	Average attendance	Top goalscorer(s)	
Season	Div	League	Pld	W	D	L	GF	GA	GD	Pts	PPG	Pos.	Playoffs	CC	Continental	Average attendance	Name	Goals
2019	1	CPL	28	8	4	16	30	52	–22	28	1.00	6th	DNQ	R2	DNQ	5,335	(Canada) Marco Bustos	7
2020	1	CPL	7	2	2	3	8	9	–1	8	1.14	6th	DNQ	DNQ	DNQ	N/A	Eight players	1
2021	1	CPL	28	10	5	13	38	36	+2	35	1.25	5th	DNQ	QF	DNQ		(New Zealand) Moses Dyer	9
2022	1	CPL	28	10	7	11	36	34	+2	37	1.32	5th	DNQ	PR	DNQ	3,111	(New Zealand) Moses Dyer	9
2023	1	CPL	28	6	8	14	25	38	–13	26	0.93	8th	DNQ	PR	DNQ	3,220	(Canada) Diego Gutiérrez (Chile) Walter Ponce (England) Kian Williams	4
2024	1	CPL	28	7	7	14	31	42	–11	28	1.00	8th	DNQ	PR	DNQ	3,106	(Canada) Shaan Hundal (Australia) Jordan Swibel	7
2025	1	CPL	28	7	5	16	35	62	–27	26	0.93	6th	DNQ	QF	DNQ	3,213	(Canada) Myles Morgan	7

1. Average attendance include statistics from league matches only.
2. Top goalscorer(s) includes all goals scored in league season, league playoffs, Canadian Championship, CONCACAF League, and other competitive continental matches.

=== All-time most appearances ===
As of December 31, 2025

#	Name	Nation	Career	Appearances			
#	Name	Nation	Career	CPL	Cup	Int'l	Total
1	Raphael Ohin	Ghana	2019–2025	101	7	0	108
2	Diego Gutiérrez	Canada	2019–2020, 2022–2023	79	3	0	82
3	Andy Baquero	Cuba	2021–2023	74	2	0	76
4	Federico Peña	Trinidad and Tobago	2019–2022	59	3	0	62
4	Rocco Romeo	Canada	2021–2022, 2025	56	6	0	62
6	Daryl Fordyce	Northern Ireland	2020–2022	56	3	0	59
7	Themi Antonoglou	Canada	2024–2025	53	4	0	57
7	Dante Campbell	Canada	2020, 2023–2025	55	2	0	57
7	Moses Dyer	New Zealand	2020–2022	54	3	0	57
10	Stefan Cebara	Canada	2020–2022	54	2	0	56
10	Diogo Ressurreição	Portugal	2024–2025	53	3	0	56

=== All-time top scorers ===
As of December 31, 2025

#	Name	Nation	Career	Goals			
#	Name	Nation	Career	CPL	Cup	Int'l	Total
1	Moses Dyer	New Zealand	2020–2022	19	0	0	19
2	William Akio	South Sudan	2021–2022	10	0	0	10
3	Shaan Hundal	Canada	2020, 2024–2025	9	0	0	9
4	Marco Bustos	Canada	2019	7	1	0	8
4	Austin Ricci	Canada	2020–2021	5	3	0	8
6	Myles Morgan	Canada	2025	7	0	0	7
6	Sean Rea	Canada	2021–2022	6	1	0	7
6	Jordan Swibel	Australia	2024	7	0	0	7
9	Tyler Attardo	Canada	2019	6	0	0	6
9	Matteo de Brienne	Canada	2022–2023	6	0	0	6
9	Michael Petrasso	Canada	2019	6	0	0	6
9	Walter Ponce	Chile	2022–2023	6	0	0	6
9	Kian Williams	England	2023–2025	6	0	0	6
