= 2022 Canadian Premier League season =

Professional soccer league season

Canadian Premier League
- Season: 2022
- Dates: April 7 – October 9 (regular season)
- Champions: Forge FC (3rd title)
- CPL Shield: Atlético Ottawa (1st shield)
- Matches: 112
- Goals: 280 (2.5 per match)
- Top goalscorer: Alejandro Díaz (13 goals)
- Biggest home win: Forge 5–1 FC Edmonton (July 19)
- Biggest away win: Atlético Ottawa 1–6 Valour (April 24)
- Highest scoring: Atlético Ottawa 1–6 Valour (April 24); FC Edmonton 3–4 Forge (May 31)
- Longest winning run: 6 matches Forge (July 8 – August 6)
- Longest unbeaten run: 11 matches Cavalry (May 1 – July 14)
- Longest winless run: 11 matches FC Edmonton (April 10 – June 14)
- Longest losing run: 5 matches FC Edmonton (April 30 – May 31)
- Highest attendance: 6,574; Atlético Ottawa 2–1 FC Edmonton (August 7)
- Lowest attendance: 600; FC Edmonton 1–1 York United (April 15)
- Total attendance: 355,696
- Average attendance: 3,176

The 2022 Canadian Premier League season is the fourth season of the Canadian Premier League, the top men's professional level of the Canadian Soccer Association's league system. Pacific FC are the defending champions, having beaten Forge FC in the 2021 final.

The regular season ran from April 7 to October 9, 2022. Each team played four games against each of the seven opponents for a total of 28 matches. Atlético Ottawa won the regular season championship on October 8, securing the club its first trophy.

The top four teams from the regular season qualified for the playoffs where they competed for the league title. Forge FC defeated Atlético Ottawa in the 2022 Final to win their third title.

== Team and rule changes ==
The eight teams that competed in the 2021 Canadian Premier League season returned for the 2022 season. This was the last season to feature FC Edmonton and the last season before the debut of Vancouver FC in 2023.

The maximum team compensation for this season remained at $1.2 million split between players and coaching staff. The required spend on player compensation was $650,000 to $850,000. In 2022, the U21 player salary rule was introduced which counts financial compensation to players aged 21 or under at 50% towards the cap (up to a maximum of $100,000).

== Teams ==
=== Stadiums and locations ===
Locations of clubs in the 2022 Canadian Premier League season.

Club	Location	Stadium	Capacity
Atlético Ottawa	Ottawa	TD Place Stadium	24,000
Cavalry FC	Foothills County	ATCO Field	6,000
FC Edmonton	Edmonton	Clarke Stadium	5,100
Forge FC	Hamilton	Tim Hortons Field	23,218
HFX Wanderers FC	Halifax	Wanderers Grounds	6,500
Pacific FC	Langford	Starlight Stadium	6,000
Valour FC	Winnipeg	IG Field	33,000
York United FC	Toronto	York Lions Stadium	4,000

=== Personnel and sponsorship ===
Team	Head coach	Captain	Shirt sponsor	Kit manufacturer
Atlético Ottawa	(Spain) Carlos González	(Canada) Drew Beckie	ComeOn!	Macron
Cavalry	(England) Tommy Wheeldon Jr.	(Canada) Mason Trafford	WestJet	Macron
FC Edmonton	(South Africa) Alan Koch	(Canada) Shamit Shome	Swoop	Macron
Forge	(Canada) Bobby Smyrniotis	(Canada) Kyle Bekker	Tim Hortons	Macron
HFX Wanderers	(Tobago) Stephen Hart	(Trinidad and Tobago) Andre Rampersad	Volkswagen	Macron
Pacific	(Canada) James Merriman	(Canada) Jamar Dixon	Volkswagen	Macron
Valour	(Canada) Phillip Dos Santos	(Northern Ireland) Daryl Fordyce	OneSoccer	Macron
York United	(Canada) Martin Nash	(Canada) Roger Thompson	Greenpark Group	Macron

=== Number of teams by province or territory ===
Rank	Province or territory	Number	Teams
1	Ontario	3	Atlético Ottawa; Forge; York United
2	Alberta	2	Cavalry; FC Edmonton
3	British Columbia	1	Pacific
3	Manitoba	1	Valour
3	Nova Scotia	1	HFX Wanderers

=== Coaching changes ===
Team	Outgoing coach	Manner of departure	Date of vacancy	Position in table	Incoming coach	Date of appointment
York United	(Canada) Jimmy Brennan	End of contract	November 23, 2021	Pre-season	(Canada) Martin Nash	December 21, 2021
Atlético Ottawa	(Spain) Mista	End of contract	December 28, 2021	Pre-season	(Spain) Carlos González	February 24, 2022
Pacific	(Norway) Pa-Modou Kah	Signed by North Texas SC	January 21, 2022	Pre-season	(Canada) James Merriman	January 21, 2022

== Regular season ==
=== Format ===
The regular season took place from April 7 to October 9. The schedule format is a quadruple round robin with each team playing two matches at home and two matches away against each of the seven opponents for a total of 28 games. The majority of matches were played on weekends.

=== Table ===
Pos	Team	Pld	W	D	L	GF	GA	GD	Pts	Qualification
1	Atlético Ottawa (S)	28	13	10	5	36	29	+7	49	Advance to playoffs
2	Forge (C)	28	14	5	9	47	25	+22	47	Advance to playoffs
3	Cavalry	28	14	5	9	39	33	+6	47	Advance to playoffs
4	Pacific	28	13	7	8	36	33	+3	46	Advance to playoffs
5	Valour	28	10	7	11	36	34	+2	37	
6	York United	28	9	7	12	31	37	−6	34	
7	HFX Wanderers	28	8	5	15	24	38	−14	29	
8	FC Edmonton	28	4	8	16	31	51	−20	20	

Source: CanPL.ca
Rules for classification: 1) points; 2) total wins; 3) goal differential; 4) goals for; 5) away goals differential; 6) away goals for; 7) home goals differential; 8) home goals for; 9) U-21 minutes; 10) coin toss or drawing of lots.
(C) Champion; (S) Regular season winner

=== Results ===
Home \ Away	ATO	CAV	EDM	FOR	HFX	PAC	VAL	YRK
Atlético Ottawa		1–0	2–1	0–4	1–0	0–1	1–6	0–0
Atlético Ottawa		1–1	0–0	0–0	3–2	2–1	1–1	2–2
Cavalry	0–3		3–1	1–2	1–0	2–0	2–1	0–1
Cavalry	1–3		2–0	2–1	3–0	1–0	2–1	1–0
FC Edmonton	1–2	0–3		3–4	1–2	0–0	1–1	1–1
FC Edmonton	1–0	0–1		1–1	3–2	2–3	3–1	3–0
Forge	1–1	2–2	3–0		1–0	3–0	0–1	1–3
Forge	0–1	2–1	5–1		1–0	0–1	3–1	2–0
HFX Wanderers	0–2	2–2	3–1	0–4		1–0	1–0	1–0
HFX Wanderers	1–2	0–0	1–1	0–3		0–2	1–0	2–4
Pacific	1–0	3–3	2–1	2–1	2–1		3–2	0–0
Pacific	1–1	3–0	1–0	1–1	0–3		2–2	1–3
Valour	0–1	2–4	1–1	1–0	0–0	1–2		1–0
Valour	1–1	2–0	1–1	1–0	1–0	1–0		2–0
York United	2–2	2–0	3–2	1–0	0–1	0–0	1–3	
York United	0–3	0–1	3–1	0–2	0–0	2–4	3–1	

Source: CanPL.ca
Legend: Blue = home team win; Yellow = draw; Red = away team win.

== Playoffs ==
The top four teams from the regular season qualified for the playoffs. The first-place team played against the fourth, and the second-place team played against the third in two-leg semifinals on October 15 and 23. The away goals rule was not used in the semifinals. The winners advanced to the CPL Final, a single match hosted by the higher-seeded team on October 30.

=== Bracket ===
Semifinals; October 15 & 23
4	Pacific FC	0	1	1
1	Atlético Ottawa	2	1	3
3	Cavalry FC	1	1	2
2	Forge FC	1	2	3

Final; October 30
1	Atlético Ottawa	0
2	Forge FC	2

=== Semifinals ===
==== Summary ====
Team 1	Agg.	Team 2	1st leg	2nd leg
Pacific FC	1–3	Atlético Ottawa	0–2	1–1
Cavalry FC	2–3	Forge FC	1–1	1–2

==== Matches ====
October 15, 2022
4:00 pm PT

Pacific FC	0–2	Atlético Ottawa
	Report	Tabla 79'; Verhoven 90+5'

Starlight Stadium, Langford, British Columbia
Attendance: 3,759
Referee: Mathieu Souaré
October 23, 2022
2:00 pm ET

Atlético Ottawa	1–1	Pacific FC
Shaw 83'	Report	Meilleur-Giguère 28'

TD Place Stadium, Ottawa, Ontario
Attendance: 8,428
Referee: Pierre-Luc Lauzière

Atlético Ottawa won 3–1 on aggregate.

October 15, 2022
2:00 pm MT

Cavalry FC	1–1	Forge FC
Klomp 42'	Report	Pacius 47'

ATCO Field, Foothills County, Alberta
Attendance: 3,179
Referee: Alain Ruch
October 23, 2022
5:00 pm ET

Forge FC	2–1	Cavalry FC
Choinière 69'; Pacius 75' (pen.)	Report	Bevan 78'

Tim Hortons Field, Hamilton, Ontario
Attendance: 7,133
Referee: Yusri Rudolf

Forge FC won 3–2 on aggregate.

=== Final ===
October 30, 2022
6:00 pm ET

Atlético Ottawa	0–2	Forge FC
	Report	Hojabrpour 28'; Choinière 78'

TD Place Stadium, Ottawa, Ontario
Attendance: 14,992
Referee: Filip Dujic

== Awards ==
=== Canadian Premier League Awards ===
Award	Recipient	Finalist
Golden Boot (Hunter)	(Mexico) Alejandro Díaz (Pacific FC)	N/A
Golden Glove (Qimmiq or Canadian Inuit Dog)	(Canada) Marco Carducci (Cavalry FC)	(Canada) Nathan Ingham (Atlético Ottawa) (Canada) Callum Irving (Pacific FC)
Coach of the Year (Owl)	(Spain) Carlos González (Atlético Ottawa)	(Canada) James Merriman (Pacific FC) (Canada) Bobby Smyrniotis (Forge FC)
Player of the Year (Nikisuittuq)	(Northern Ireland) Ollie Bassett (Atlético Ottawa)	(Sweden) Alexander Achinioti-Jönsson (Forge FC) (Canada) Manny Aparicio (Pacific FC) (Canada) Ballou Tabla (Atlético Ottawa) (Canada) Sean Rea (Valour FC)
Best Under 21 Canadian Player of the Year (Polar Bear)	(Canada) Sean Rea (Valour FC)	(Haiti) Woobens Pacius (Forge FC) (Guyana) Osaze De Rosario (York United FC)
Defender of the Year (Walrus)	(Sweden) Alexander Achinioti-Jönsson (Forge FC)	(Canada) Amer Đidić (Pacific FC) (Canada) Dominick Zator (York United FC)
Players' Player of the Year (Muskox)	(Northern Ireland) Ollie Bassett (Atlético Ottawa)	(Canada) Ballou Tabla (Atlético Ottawa) (Mexico) Alejandro Díaz (Pacific FC)

=== Team of the Week ===
The Gatorade Team of the Week is selected by OneSoccer staff.

Team of the Week
Dates	Goalkeeper	Defenders	Midfielders	Forwards	Ref
April 7–10	(Canada) Oxner (HFX)	(Canada) Fernandez (HFX) (Canada) Yao (Cavalry) (Canada) Đidić (Pacific) (England) Mavila (Pacific)	(Northern Ireland) Bassett (Ottawa) (Canada) Aparicio (Pacific) (Germany) Warschewski (Edmonton) (Brazil) Morelli (HFX) (United States) Gonzalez (Edmonton)	(Mexico) Díaz (Pacific)	
April 15–17	(Canada) Ingham (Ottawa)	(Canada) N'sa (York) (Spain) Espejo (Ottawa) (Trinidad and Tobago) Singh (Edmonton) (Spain) Acosta (Ottawa)	(Canada) Bustos (Pacific) (Northern Ireland) Bassett (Ottawa) (Canada) Gagnon-Laparé (HFX) (Somalia) Musse (Cavalry)	(Canada) Shaw (Ottawa) (Republic of Ireland) Mason (Cavalry)	
April 22–24	(Canada) Giantsopoulos (York)	(Canada) Romeo (Valour) (Canada) Zator (York) (Canada) Samuel (Forge)	(South Sudan) Akio (Valour) (Trinidad and Tobago) Rampersad (HFX) (Canada) Aparicio (Pacific) (Canada) Levis (Valour)	(New Zealand) Dyer (Valour) (Canada) Campbell (Forge) (Canada) Riggi (Valour)	
April 27 – May 1	(Canada) Carducci (Cavalry)	(Canada) Fernandez (HFX) (Cameroon) Niba (Ottawa) (Canada) Yao (Cavalry)	(Canada) Tabla (Ottawa) (Canada) Lamothe (HFX) (Canada) McKendry (Ottawa) (England) Bent (HFX)	(Canada) Salter (HFX) (Republic of Ireland) Mason (Cavalry) (United States) De Rosario (York)	
May 6–7	(Canada) Irving (Pacific)	(Canada) Dada-Luke (Pacific) (Canada) Zator (York) (Canada) M. Trafford (Cavalry) (Canada) Đidić (Pacific)	(Canada) Aparicio (Pacific) (Canada) Johnston (York) (Trinidad and Tobago) Rampersad (HFX)	(Colombia) Gutiérrez (York) (Somalia) Musse (Cavalry) (Canada) Tabla (Ottawa)	
May 14–15	(Canada) Sirois (Valour)	(Mali) Sissoko (Forge) (Netherlands) Klomp (Cavalry) (Sweden) Achinioti-Jönsson (Forge) (Canada) Abzi (York)	(Northern Ireland) Bassett (Ottawa) (Canada) Dixon (Pacific) (Canada) Aparicio (Pacific)	(Canada) Rea (Valour) (Canada) Salter (HFX) (Mexico) Diaz (Pacific)	
May 20–22	(Estonia) Vaikla (Edmonton)	(Canada) N'sa (York) (Canada) Đidić (Pacific) (Sweden) Achinioti-Jönsson (Forge) (Netherlands) Vliet (Cavalry)	(Canada) Hojabrpour (Forge) (Canada) Bekker (Forge) (Northern Ireland) Bassett (Ottawa)	(Canada) Fisk (Cavalry) (Canada) Wright (Ottawa) (Canada) Choinière (Forge)	
May 28 – June 1	(Canada) Carducci (Cavalry)	(Canada) Beckie (Ottawa) (Canada) Yao (Cavalry) (Canada) M. Trafford (Cavalry) (Mali) Sissoko (Forge) (Canada) Verhoven (Ottawa)	(Canada) Haworth (Ottawa) (Canada) Camargo (Cavalry) (Canada) Rea (Valour) (Canada) Borges (Forge)	(Netherlands) dos Santos (Pacific)	
June 4–5	(Estonia) Vaikla (Edmonton)	(Spain) Acosta (Ottawa) (Spain) Espejo (Ottawa) (Canada) Restrepo (HFX) (Canada) Levis (Valour)	(Argentina) Hernández (York) (Northern Ireland) Bassett (Ottawa) (Trinidad and Tobago) Rampersad (HFX) (Canada) Bitar (Edmonton)	(Canada) Tabla (Ottawa) (Trinidad and Tobago) Garcia (HFX)	
June 11–15	(Canada) Ingham (Ottawa)	(Canada) Loturi (Cavalry) (Canada) Yao (Cavalry) (Canada) M. Trafford (Cavalry) (Canada) Morgan (Forge)	(Mali) Sissoko (Forge) (Canada) Hojabrpour (Forge) (Canada) Borges (Forge) (Canada) Camargo (Cavalry) (Canada) Salter (HFX)	(England) Pepple (Cavalry)	
June 18–19	(Estonia) Vaikla (Edmonton)	(Canada) Meilleur-Giguère (Pacific) (Haiti) Bissainthe (Edmonton) (Canada) Wilson (York)	(Canada) Abzi (York) (Canada) Bekker (Forge) (Canada) Jensen (Forge) (Albania) Rama (Forge)	(United States) Gonzalez (Edmonton) (Canada) Pacius (Forge) (Canada) Choinière (Forge)	
June 25–26	(Canada) Oxner (HFX)	(Netherlands) Klomp (Cavalry) (Haiti) Jean-Baptiste (Valour) (Canada) Gander (HFX)	(Canada) Riggi (Valour) (Canada) Polisi (HFX) (Canada) Bitar (Edmonton) (Honduras) Escalante (Cavalry)	(Canada) Rea (Valour) (England) Pepple (Cavalry) (Canada) Daniels (HFX)	
June 29 – July 3	(Canada) Sirois (Valour)	(Canada) Beckie (Ottawa) (Haiti) Jean-Baptiste (Valour) (Spain) Acosta (Ottawa)	(Canada) Timoteo (Edmonton) (Northern Ireland) Bassett (Ottawa) (Canada) Bitar (Edmonton) (Honduras) Escalante (Cavalry)	(Netherlands) dos Santos (Pacific) (Guinea) Camara (Edmonton) (South Sudan) Akio (Valour)	
July 8–10	(Canada) Henry (Forge)	(Albania) Rama (Forge) (Canada) Yao (Cavalry) (England) Owolabi-Belewu (Forge) (Canada) Levis (Valour)	(Canada) C. Trafford (Cavalry) (Mali) Sissoko (Forge) (Canada) Tabla (Ottawa) (Netherlands) dos Santos (Pacific) (Netherlands) Daniels (Pacific)	(New Zealand) Dyer (Valour)	
July 14–20	(Canada) Giantsopoulos (York)	(Canada) Dada-Luke (Pacific) (Sweden) Achinioti-Jönsson (Forge) (Canada) Zator (York) (Netherlands) Vliet (Cavalry)	(Somalia) Musse (Cavalry) (Canada) Bekker (Forge) (Canada) Johnston (York) (Netherlands) dos Santos (Pacific)	(Mexico) Diaz (Pacific) (Canada) Pacius (Forge)	
July 22–24	(Canada) Irving (Pacific)	(Spain) Acosta (Ottawa) (Canada) Đidić (Pacific) (Canada) Beckie (Ottawa)	(Albania) Rama (Forge) (Canada) Bekker (Forge) (Canada) Young (Pacific) (Canada) Tissot (Ottawa)	(Canada) Campbell (Forge) (Canada) Bustos (Pacific) (England) Mwandwe (HFX)	
July 27 – August 1	(Canada) Carducci (Cavalry)	(Albania) Rama (Forge) (Canada) Yao (Cavalry) (Haiti) Metusala (Forge) (Australia) Lawrie-Lattanzio (York)	(Mali) Sissoko (Forge) (Canada) Bekker (Forge) (Canada) Wilson (York)	(Mexico) Diaz (Pacific) (Canada) Campbell (Forge) (United States) De Rosario (York)	
August 3–7	(Algeria) Yesli (Valour)	(Albania) Rama (Forge) (Sweden) Achinioti-Jönsson (Forge) (Algeria) Mekidèche (Valour) (Canada) Levis (Valour)	(Canada) Hojabrpour (Forge) (France) Sissoko (Ottawa)	(Turks and Caicos Islands) Forbes (Valour) (New Zealand) Dyer (Valour) (Canada) Tabla (Ottawa) (Canada) Pacius (Forge)	
August 12–14	(Canada) Henry (Forge)	(Mali) Samake (Pacific) (Canada) Yao (Cavalry) (Netherlands) Vliet (Cavalry)	(Germany) Warschewski (Edmonton) (Canada) Omar (HFX) (Canada) Young (Pacific) (Canada) Verhoeven (York) (Honduras) Escalante (Cavalry)	(Wales) Heard (Pacific) (Republic of Ireland) Mason (Cavalry)	
August 17–21	(Canada) Himaras (York)	(Canada) Timoteo (Edmonton) (Canada) Meilleur-Giguère (Pacific) (Canada) Beckie (Ottawa) (Canada) N'sa (York)	(Canada) Lamothe (HFX) (Northern Ireland) Bassett (Ottawa) (Canada) Rea (Valour) (Canada) Alemán (Ottawa) (Syria) Babouli (York)	(United States) De Rosario (York)	
August 27–28	(Canada) Irving (Pacific)	(Canada) Timoteo (Edmonton) (Canada) Romeo (Valour) (Spain) Espejo (Ottawa) (Cuba) Baquero (Valour)	(Northern Ireland) Bassett (Ottawa) (France) Sissoko (Ottawa) (Canada) Salter (HFX) (Honduras) Escalante (Cavalry) (Canada) Rea (Valour)	(Germany) Warschewski (Edmonton)	
September 2–5	(Canada) Carducci (Cavalry)	(Canada) Zator (York) (Canada) Campagna (HFX) (Spain) Espejo (Ottawa)	(Canada) Levis (Valour) (Canada) Shome (Edmonton) (Trinidad and Tobago) Rampersad (HFX) (Canada) Dada-Luke (Pacific)	(Syria) Babouli (York) (United States) De Rosario (York) (Portugal) dos Santos (York)	
September 9–11	(Canada) Baskett (HFX)	(Belgium) Krutzen (Forge) (Spain) Espejo (Ottawa) (Canada) Đidić (Pacific) (Canada) N'sa (York)	(Canada) Young (Pacific) (Syria) Babouli (York) (Mali) Sissoko (Forge)	(Canada) Salter (HFX) (United States) De Rosario (York) (Canada) Choinière (Forge)	
September 16–18	(Canada) Irving (Pacific)	(Belgium) Krutzen (Forge) (Haiti) Jean-Baptiste (Valour) (Canada) Campagna (HFX)	(Canada) Poku (Forge) (Canada) Hojabrpour (Forge) (Northern Ireland) Bassett (Ottawa) (Spain) Alarcón (Cavalry)	(Canada) Borges (Forge) (Republic of Ireland) Mason (Cavalry) (Canada) Rea (Valour)	
September 23–27	(Zimbabwe) Murasiranwa (Edmonton)	(Australia) Mourdoukoutas (York) (Spain) Espejo (Ottawa) (Canada) N'sa (York)	(Netherlands) dos Santos (Pacific) (Northern Ireland) Bassett (Ottawa) (Canada) Toussaint (Pacific) (Canada) Smith (Edmonton) (Canada) Aparicio (Pacific)	(Canada) Tabla (Ottawa) (Syria) Babouli (York)	
September 30- October 2	(Canada) Ingham (Ottawa)	(Spain) Alarcón (Cavalry) (Sweden) Achinioti-Jönsson (Forge) (England) Owolabi-Belewu (Forge) (Canada) Tissot (Ottawa)	(Canada) Bahous (Ottawa) (Mali) Sissoko (Forge) (Canada) Aparicio (Pacific) (Canada) Borges (Forge)	(Canada) Bustos (Pacific) (Somalia) Musse (Cavalry)	

=== Monthly awards ===
Month	Manager of the Month		Player of the Month		References
Month	Manager	Club	Player	Club	References
April	(Canada) James Merriman	Pacific FC	(Canada) Marco Bustos	Pacific FC	
May	(England) Tommy Wheeldon Jr.	Cavalry FC	(Northern Ireland) Ollie Bassett	Atlético Ottawa	
June	(Spain) Carlos González	Atlético Ottawa	(England) Aribim Pepple	Cavalry FC	
July	(Canada) Bobby Smyrniotis	Forge FC	(Canada) Woobens Pacius	Forge FC	
August	(Canada) Phillip Dos Santos	Valour FC	(Canada) Sean Rea	Valour FC	
September	(Canada) Martin Nash	York United FC	(Syria) Mo Babouli	York United FC	
October	(Canada) Bobby Smyrniotis	Forge FC	(Canada) David Choinière	Forge FC	

== Attendance ==
Pos	Team	Total	High	Low	Average	Change
1	HFX Wanderers FC	81,547	6,500	4,332	5,825	n/a
2	Atlético Ottawa	56,961	6,574	2,571	4,069	n/a
3	Cavalry FC	48,883	4,743	2,943	3,492	n/a
4	Forge FC	48,027	5,129	1,187	3,431	n/a
5	Pacific FC	44,459	4,107	2,420	3,176	n/a
6	Valour FC	43,547	5,227	2,395	3,111	n/a
7	York United FC	17,272	1,802	1,002	1,234	n/a
8	FC Edmonton	15,000	1,613	600	1,071	n/a
	League total	355,696	6,574	600	3,176	n/a

== Statistical leaders ==
=== Top scorers ===
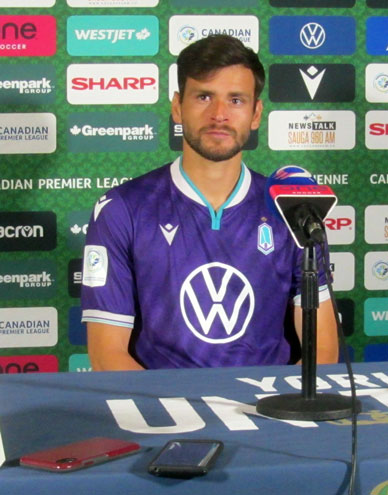
Alejandro Díaz was the top scorer of the 2022 season, with 13 goals.

Rank	Player	Club	Goals
1	(Mexico) Alejandro Díaz	Pacific	13
2	(Guyana) Osaze De Rosario	York United	12
2	(Haiti) Woobens Pacius	Forge	12
4	(Canada) Samuel Salter	HFX Wanderers	11
5	(New Zealand) Moses Dyer	Valour	9
6	(Northern Ireland) Ollie Bassett	Atlético Ottawa	8
6	(Republic of Ireland) Joe Mason	Cavalry	8
8	(Somalia) Ali Musse	Cavalry	7
8	(Canada) Ballou Tabla	Atlético Ottawa	7
8	(Germany) Tobias Warschewski	FC Edmonton	7
8	(Canada) Brian Wright	Atlético Ottawa	7

=== Top assists ===
Rank	Player	Club	Assists
1	(Canada) Sean Rea	Valour	9
2	(Canada) Tristan Borges	Forge	8
3	(Canada) Kyle Bekker	Forge	6
3	(Canada) Marco Bustos	Pacific	6
5	(Canada) Wesley Timoteo	FC Edmonton	5
5	(Honduras) José Escalante	Cavalry	5
7	(Canada) Terran Campbell	Forge	4
7	(Canada) David Choinière	Forge	4
7	(Canada) Zachary Fernandez	HFX Wanderers	4
7	(Canada) Carl Haworth	Atlético Ottawa	4
7	(Canada) Ballou Tabla	Atlético Ottawa	4
7	(Germany) Tobias Warschewski	FC Edmonton	4

=== Clean sheets ===
Rank	Player	Club	Clean sheets
1	(Canada) Triston Henry	Forge	11
2	(Canada) Marco Carducci	Cavalry	10
3	(Canada) Nathan Ingham	Atlético Ottawa	9
3	(Canada) Callum Irving	Pacific	9
5	(Canada) Niko Giantsopoulos	York United	6

=== Hat-tricks ===
Player	For	Against	Result	Date	Ref
(Canada) Tristan Borges	Forge	FC Edmonton	4–3 (A)	May 31	
(Mexico) Alejandro Díaz	Pacific	York United	4–2 (A)	July 15	
(Haiti) Woobens Pacius	Forge	FC Edmonton	5–1 (H)	July 19	

== Player transfers ==
=== U Sports Draft ===
The 2022 CPL–U Sports Draft was held on January 20, 2022, with Atletico Ottawa selecting José da Cunha of Cape Breton University first overall. Each team made two picks in the draft, for a total of 16 selections.

=== Foreign players ===
Canadian Premier League teams can sign a maximum of seven international players, out of which only five can be in the starting line-up for each match. Teams are required to carry a minimum of four international players, either signed through or approved by the league's scouting partner, 21st Club. The following players were considered foreign players for the 2022 season. This list does not include Canadian citizens who represent other countries at the international level.

Club	Player 1	Player 2	Player 3	Player 4	Player 5	Player 6	Player 7	Injured players (Note: Foreign players on the season-ending injury list can be replaced on the active roster)	Former players
Atlético Ottawa	(Spain) Miguel Acosta	(Northern Ireland) Ollie Bassett	(Spain) Diego Espejo	(Mexico) Vladimir Moragrega	(France) Abdoul Sissoko	(Spain) Iván Pérez	(Spain) Sergio Camus		
Cavalry	(Honduras) José Escalante	(Republic of Ireland) Tom Field	(Netherlands) Daan Klomp	(Republic of Ireland) Joe Mason	(Germany) Julian Roloff	(Netherlands) Bradley Vliet	(Spain) Roberto Alarcón		
FC Edmonton	(Germany) Tobias Warschewski	(United States) Azriel Gonzalez	(Haiti) Bicou Bissainthe						(Germany) Julian Ulbricht
Forge	(Sweden) Alexander Achinioti-Jönsson	(Belgium) Daniël Krutzen	(England) Malik Owolabi-Belewu	(Albania) Rezart Rama					(Panama) Omar Browne
HFX Wanderers	(Trinidad and Tobago) Akeem Garcia	(Trinidad and Tobago) Andre Rampersad	(Germany) Peter Schaale	(Jamaica) Alex Marshall	(Brazil) Eriks Santos	(England) Cory Bent	(England) Lifumpa Mwandwe	(Brazil) João Morelli	
Pacific	(Netherlands) Gianni dos Santos	(Netherlands) Djenairo Daniels	(England) Nathan Mavila	(Guinea-Bissau) Umaro Baldé	(England) Jordan Brown				(Mexico) Alejandro Díaz
Valour	(Haiti) Andrew Jean-Baptiste	(New Zealand) Moses Dyer	(Chile) Walter Ponce	(United States) Jonathan Esparza	(Colombia) Daniel Ascanio	(Colombia) Kevin Rendón	(Turks and Caicos Islands) Billy Forbes		
York United	(Colombia) Sebastián Gutiérrez	(Argentina) Mateo Hernández	(Argentina) Lisandro Cabrera	(Brazil) Eduardo Jesus	(Australia) Tass Mourdoukoutas	(Australia) Luis Lawrie-Lattanzio	(Portugal) Kevin Dos Santos	(Czech Republic) Martin Graiciar (Brazil) William Wallace	(Denmark) Daniel Obbekjær

Players in italic denote players new to their respective clubs for the 2022 season, sorted chronologically by their announcement.
