= 2022 York United FC season =

York United FC
2022 season
- Chairman: Mike Baldassarra
- Head coach: Martin Nash
- Stadium: York Lions Stadium
- Canadian Premier League: 6th
- CPL playoffs: Did not qualify
- Canadian Championship: Semi-finals
- Top goalscorer: League: Osaze De Rosario (12); All: Osaze De Rosario (13)
- Highest home attendance: 1,802 (April 7 vs. HFX Wanderers FC)
- Average home league attendance: 1,234
Home colours	Away colours	Third colours

The 2022 York United FC season was the fourth season in the history of York United FC. In addition to the Canadian Premier League, the club also competed in the Canadian Championship.

This was the club's first season led by Martin Nash, who was announced as the club's new head coach on December 21, 2021.

== Squad ==
As of August 11, 2022.

No.	Player	Nationality	Position(s)	Date of birth (age)	Previous club
Goalkeepers
1	Niko Giantsopoulos	(Canada)	GK	June 24, 1994 (aged 28)	(Canada) Cavalry FC
67	Eleias Himaras	(Canada)	GK	March 8, 2002 (aged 20)	(Canada) Electric City
Defenders
2	Eduardo Jesus	(Brazil)	LB	March 17, 2002 (aged 20)	(Brazil) Bahia
3	Tass Mourdoukoutas	(Australia)	CB	March 3, 1999 (aged 23)	(Australia) Western Sydney Wanderers
4	Jordan Wilson	(Canada)	CB / DM / FB	October 3, 1991 (aged 31)	(Denmark) Nykøbing FC
5	Dominick Zator	(Canada)	CB	September 18, 1994 (aged 28)	(Canada) Cavalry FC
6	Roger Thompson	(Canada)	CB	December 19, 1991 (aged 31)	(Sweden) Ljungskile SK
14	Paris Gee	(Canada)	LB / RB	July 5, 1994 (aged 28)	(Canada) FC Edmonton
23	Chrisnovic N'sa	(Canada)	CB / RB	January 28, 1999 (aged 23)	(Canada) HFX Wanderers
Midfielders
7	Oliver Minatel	(Brazil) / (Canada)	AM	August 29, 1992 (aged 30)	(Canada) Cavalry FC
8	Sebastian Gutierrez	(Colombia)	AM	September 29, 1997 (aged 25)	(Colombia) Llaneros
10	Mateo Hernández	(Argentina)	AM / LW / RW	October 5, 1998 (aged 24)	(Argentina) Colón
11	Kevin Dos Santos	(Portugal)	LW / RW	October 20, 1999 (aged 23)	(England) Darlington F.C.
16	Max Ferrari	(Canada)	AM / LW / RW	August 20, 2000 (aged 22)	(Canada) Aurora FC
19	Noah Verhoeven	(Canada)	CM	June 15, 1999 (aged 23)	(Canada) Pacific FC
21	Michael Petrasso	(Canada)	LW / RW	July 9, 1995 (aged 27)	(Canada) Valour FC
33	Matthew Baldisimo	(Canada)	DM / CM	January 20, 1998 (aged 24)	(Canada) Pacific FC
44	Isaiah Johnston	(Canada)	CM	August 14, 2001 (aged 21)	(Canada) CBU Capers
99	William Wallace	(Brazil)	LW / RW / CM	July 4, 2002 (aged 20)	(Brazil) Fluminense
Forwards
9	Lisandro Cabrera	(Argentina)	ST	January 4, 1998 (aged 24)	(Argentina) Newell's Old Boys
18	Molham Babouli	(Syria) / (Canada)	CF / LW / RW	February 1, 1993 (aged 29)	(Qatar) Muaither SC
11	Martin Graiciar	(Czech Republic)	ST	April 11, 1999 (aged 23)	(Italy) Fiorentina
22	Austin Ricci	(Canada)	CF	April 8, 1996 (aged 26)	(Canada) Valour FC
24	Osaze De Rosario	(United States) / (Canada)	ST	July 19, 2001 (aged 21)	(Ukraine) Rukh Lviv
25	Luis Lawrie-Lattanzio	(Australia)	CF / LW / RW	February 20, 2002 (aged 20)	(Australia) Campbelltown City
27	Ronan Kratt	(Canada)	CF / LW / RW	September 2, 2003 (aged 19)	(Germany) SSV Ulm 1846 U19

== Transfers ==
=== In ===
No.	Pos.	Player	From club	Fee/notes	Date	Source
17	FW	(Canada) Mouhamadou Kane	(Canada) CF Montréal	Free	December 15, 2021	
3	DF	(Denmark) Daniel Obbekjær	(Denmark) OB	Free	January 5, 2022	
2	DF	(Brazil) Eduardo Jesus	(Brazil) Bahia	Free	January 6, 2022	
11	FW	(Czech Republic) Martin Graiciar	(Italy) Fiorentina	Free	January 7, 2022	
7	MF	(Brazil) Oliver Minatel	(Canada) Cavalry FC	Free, Domestic roster position as permanent resident of Canada	January 25, 2022	
	FW	(Germany) Tobias Warschewski	(Canada) FC Edmonton	Free, Signed and loaned to FC Edmonton	February 10, 2022	
76	GK	(Canada) Matthew Nogueira	(Portugal) C.S. Marítimo B	Free	March 10, 2022	
	MF	(United States) Azriel Gonzalez	(United States) Tacoma Defiance	Free, Signed and loaned to FC Edmonton	April 1, 2022	
24	FW	(United States) Osaze De Rosario	(Ukraine) Rukh Lviv	Free, Domestic roster position as he has Canada citizenship	April 6, 2022	
12	GK	(Canada) Gianluca Catalano	(Canada) UConn Huskies	Free, Emergency signing	April 7, 2022	
22	FW	(Canada) Austin Ricci	(Canada) Valour FC	Free	April 27, 2022	
98	FW	(Canada) Cyrus Rollocks	(Canada) Scrosoppi FC	Free, Emergency signing	June 26, 2022	
27	FW	(Canada) Ronan Kratt	(Germany) SSV Ulm 1846	Free	July 1, 2022	
3	DF	(Australia) Tass Mourdoukoutas	(Australia) Western Sydney Wanderers	Free	July 1, 2022	
25	FW	(Australia) Luis Lawrie-Lattanzio	(Australia) Campbelltown City	Free	July 6, 2022	
11	MF	(Portugal) Kevin Dos Santos	(England) Darlington F.C.	Free	July 12, 2022	
67	GK	(Canada) Eleias Himaras	(Canada) Electric City FC	Free	July 19, 2022	
14	DF	(Canada) Paris Gee	(Canada) FC Edmonton	Free	July 29, 2022	
18	FW	(Canada) Molham Babouli	(Qatar) Muaither SC	Free	August 10, 2022	

==== Loans in ====
No.	Pos.	Player	Loaned from	Fee/notes	Date	Source
33	MF	(Canada) Matthew Baldisimo	(Canada) Pacific FC	Season-long loan	August 11, 2022	

==== Draft picks ====
York United will make the following selections in the 2022 CPL–U Sports Draft. Draft picks are not automatically signed to the team roster. Only those who are signed to a contract will be listed as transfers in.

Round	Selection	Pos.	Player	Nationality	University
1	5	FW	Christian Rossi	Canada	Trinity Western University
2	13	MF	Soji Olatoye	Canada	York University

=== Out ===
==== Transferred out ====
No.	Pos.	Player	To club	Fee/notes	Date	Source
29	GK	(Canada) Nathan Ingham	(Canada) Atlético Ottawa	Contract expired	December 16, 2021	
3	DF	(Canada) Matteo Campagna	(Canada) Vancouver Whitecaps FC	Loan expired	December 26, 2021	
7	FW	(Spain) Álvaro Rivero	(Spain) CD Gerena	Contract expired	December 26, 2021	
11	FW	(Jamaica) Nicholas Hamilton	(Jamaica) Harbour View FC	Contract expired	December 26, 2021	
13	FW	(United States) Osvaldo Ramírez		Contract expired	December 26, 2021	
23	MF	(Dominican Republic) Gerard Lavergne	(Dominican Republic) Atlético Pantoja	Contract expired	December 26, 2021	
30	MF	(Canada) Muslim Umar	(Canada) FC Edmonton	Contract expired	December 26, 2021	
42	DF	(Canada) Ryan Lindsay	(Estonia) JK Narva Trans	Contract expired	December 26, 2021	
70	MF	(Canada) Jordan Faria	(Finland) Musan Salama	Contract expired	December 26, 2021	
14	MF	(Canada) Ijah Halley	(Canada) Scrosoppi FC	Contract expired	December 26, 2021	
12	MF	(Guyana) Javier George		Contract expired	December 26, 2021	
3	DF	(Denmark) Daniel Obbekjær	(Faroe Islands) 07 Vestur	Contract terminated by mutual consent	June 10, 2022	
20	DF	(Canada) Diyaeddine Abzi	(France) Pau FC	Undisclosed fee & sell-on clause	July 1, 2022	
	FW	(Germany) Julian Ulbricht	(Germany) 1. FC Phönix Lübeck	Undisclosed sell-on clause	July 11, 2022	
76	GK	(Canada) Matthew Nogueira		Contract terminated by mutual consent	July 19, 2022	
80	FW	(Canada) Lowell Wright	(Canada) Whitecaps FC 2	Undisclosed fee	August 3, 2022	
28	MF	(Canada) Cédric Toussaint	(Canada) Pacific FC	Undisclosed sell-on clause, and loan of Matthew Baldisimo	August 11, 2022	

==== Loans out ====
No.	Pos.	Player	Loaned to	Fee/notes	Date	Source
36	DF	(Canada) Felix N'sa	(Canada) FC Edmonton	Loaned until November 2022	February 10, 2022	
17	FW	(Germany) Julian Ulbricht	(Canada) FC Edmonton	Loaned until November 2022; recalled in July 2022	February 10, 2022	
	FW	(Germany) Tobias Warschewski	(Canada) FC Edmonton	Loaned until November 2022	February 10, 2022	
	MF	(United States) Azriel Gonzalez	(Canada) FC Edmonton	Loaned until November 2022	April 1, 2022	
1	GK	(Canada) Niko Giantsopoulos	(Canada) Vancouver Whitecaps	Loaned for one match	May 21, 2022	
17	FW	(Canada) Mouhamadou Kane	(Canada) FC Edmonton	Loaned until November 2022	July 11, 2022	

== Pre-season and friendlies ==
Win Draw Loss Fixtures

February 9 Friendly	Forge FC	0–1	York United FC	Hamilton, Ontario
			Gutiérrez	Stadium: Tim Hortons Field

March 5 Friendly	York United FC	1–1	Alliance United FC	Toronto, Ontario
		Report

March 11 Friendly	Whitecaps FC 2	0–0 (3–4 p)	York United FC	Vancouver, British Columbia
3:00pm		Report		Stadium: University of British Columbia
	Penalties
	Penalty missed Penalty scored		Obbekjær (penalty scored); De Rosario (penalty scored); Johnston (penalty scored); Kane (penalty scored)

March 15 Friendly	Valour FC	4–0	York United FC	Langford, British Columbia
	Levis 17'; Carlos; Rea; de Brienne			Stadium: Starlight Stadium

March 18 Friendly	Pacific FC	2–1	York United FC	Langford, British Columbia
4:00pm	Goal	Report	Zator 80'	Stadium: Starlight Stadium

March 26 Friendly	Toronto FC II	3–0	York United FC	Toronto, Ontario
11:00am	Goal	Report

March 31 Friendly	Forge FC	1–1	York United FC	Hamilton, Ontario
	Campbell 8'	Report	Gutiérrez 34'	Stadium: Tim Hortons Field

== Competitions ==
Matches are listed in Toronto local time: Eastern Daylight Time (UTC−4) until November 5, and Eastern Standard Time (UTC−5) otherwise.

=== Overview ===
Competition	Record							
Competition	Pld	W	D	L	GF	GA	GD	Win %
Canadian Premier League	28	9	7	12	31	37	−6	32.14
Canadian Championship	3	0	2	1	4	5	−1	0.00
Total	31	9	9	13	35	42	−7	29.03

Last updated: October 9, 2022
Source: Competitions

=== Canadian Premier League ===
==== Table ====
Pos	Team	Pld	W	D	L	GF	GA	GD	Pts	Qualification
1	Atlético Ottawa (S)	28	13	10	5	36	29	+7	49	Advance to playoffs
2	Forge (C)	28	14	5	9	47	25	+22	47	Advance to playoffs
3	Cavalry	28	14	5	9	39	33	+6	47	Advance to playoffs
4	Pacific	28	13	7	8	36	33	+3	46	Advance to playoffs
5	Valour	28	10	7	11	36	34	+2	37	
6	York United	28	9	7	12	31	37	−6	34	
7	HFX Wanderers	28	8	5	15	24	38	−14	29	
8	FC Edmonton	28	4	8	16	31	51	−20	20	

Source: CanPL.ca
Rules for classification: 1) points; 2) total wins; 3) goal differential; 4) goals for; 5) away goals differential; 6) away goals for; 7) home goals differential; 8) home goals for; 9) U-21 minutes; 10) coin toss or drawing of lots.
(C) Champion; (S) Regular season winner

==== Results by match ====
Match	1	2	3	4	5	6	7	8	9	10	11	12	13	14	15	16	17	18	19	20	21	22	23	24	25	26	27	28
Result	L	D	W	D	W	L	D	L	L	D	D	L	L	L	L	W	L	W	L	W	W	L	W	W	D	W	L	D
Position	7	8	5	4	2	5	4	6	7	7	7	7	7	7	7	7	7	7	7	7	7	7	6	6	6	6	6	6

Updated to match(es) played on October 9, 2022. Source: #Matches
W = Win; D = Draw; L = Loss

==== Matches ====
April 7 1	York United FC	0–1	HFX Wanderers FC	Toronto, Ontario
7:30pm	Johnston (yellow card) 65'; Hernández (red card) 90+5'	Report	Morelli 53' (pen.); Tabi (yellow card) 71'; Restrepo (yellow card) 87'	Stadium: York Lions Stadium; Attendance: 1,802; Referee: Yusri Rudolf

April 15 2	FC Edmonton	1–1	York United FC	Edmonton, Alberta
9:00pm	Kacher 84'; Smith (red card) 88'	Report	Wilson (yellow card) 23'; Thompson (yellow card) 25'; Zator (yellow card) 55'; De Rosario 82'; Abzi (yellow card) 88'; Giantsopoulos (yellow card) 89'	Stadium: Clarke Stadium; Attendance: 600; Referee: Juan Marquez

April 22 3	York United FC	2–0	Cavalry FC	Toronto, Ontario
7:30pm	Minatel 35'; Wilson (yellow card) 61'; De Rosario 73', (yellow card) 89'; N'sa (yellow card) 90+2'	Report	Klomp (yellow card) 32'; M. Trafford (yellow card) 38'; C. Trafford (yellow card) 72'; Yao (yellow card) 76'; Escalante (yellow card) 89'	Stadium: York Lions Stadium; Attendance: 1,004; Referee: Carly Shaw-MacLaren

April 29 4	York United FC	2–2	Atlético Ottawa	Toronto, Ontario
7:30pm	Abzi (yellow card) 40'; De Rosario 64' (pen.); Toussaint (red card) 90+2'; Ricci (yellow card) 90+2'; Zator 90+5'	Report	Wright 51'; Ingham (yellow card) 63'; Tabla 86'; Tissot (yellow card) 90+6'	Stadium: York Lions Stadium; Attendance: 1,043; Referee: Filip Dujic

May 6 5	York United FC	1–0	Forge FC	Toronto, Ontario
7:00pm	De Rosario (yellow card) 25'; Johnston (yellow card) 57'; Gutiérrez 79' (yellow card) 79'; Verhoeven (yellow card) 90+1'	Report	Sissoko (yellow card) 31'; Poku (yellow card) 72'; Grant (yellow card) 85'	Stadium: York Lions Stadium; Attendance: 1,108; Referee: Fabrizio Stasolla

May 15 6	Valour FC	1–0	York United FC	Winnipeg, Manitoba
5:00pm	Dyer (yellow card) 40'; Riggi (yellow card) 56'; Gutiérrez (yellow card) 67'; Rea 87'	Report	Johnston (yellow card) 40'; Wright (yellow card) 41'; Toussaint (yellow card) 42'; Hernández (yellow card) 51'	Stadium: IG Field; Attendance: 2,416; Referee: David Barrie

May 20 7	Pacific FC	0–0	York United FC	Langford, British Columbia
10:00pm	Heard (yellow card) 7'; dos Santos (yellow card) 60'; Mavila (yellow card) 90+2'	Report	Abzi (yellow card) 45'	Stadium: Starlight Stadium; Attendance: 2,620; Referee: Yusri Rudolph

May 29 8	York United FC	0–1	Cavalry FC	Toronto, Ontario
2:00pm	Toussaint (yellow card) 7'; Johnston (yellow card) 45+3'; N'sa (yellow card) 61' (yellow-red card) 83'; Abzi (yellow card) 79'; Cabrera (yellow card) 83'	Report	Musse (yellow card) 37'; Adekugbe (yellow card) 63'; Pepple 73'; Trafford (yellow card) 89'; Klomp (yellow card) 90+1'	Stadium: York Lions Stadium; Attendance: 1,267; Referee: Ben Hoskins

June 4 9	HFX Wanderers FC	1–0	York United FC	Halifax, Nova Scotia
2:00pm	Gander (yellow card) 32'; Garcia (yellow card) 45+1' (goal) 72' (pen.); Daniels (yellow card) 85'	Report		Stadium: Wanderers Grounds; Attendance: 6,224; Referee: Yusri Rudolf

June 14 10	Atlético Ottawa	0–0	York United FC	Ottawa, Ontario
7:00pm	Bahous (yellow card) 32'; Moragrega (yellow card) 45+1'; Beckie (yellow card) 58' (yellow-red card) 82'; Wright (yellow card) 90+1'	Report	Abzi (yellow card) 10'; Hernández (yellow card) 37'; Toussaint (red card) 90+2'; Kane (yellow card) 90+3'	Stadium: TD Place Stadium; Attendance: 3,950; Referee: Mathieu Souaré

June 18 11	York United FC	0–0	Pacific FC	Toronto, Ontario
4:00pm	Hernández (yellow card) 45+2'; Johnston (yellow card) 84'	Report	Dixon (yellow card) 8'; Samake (yellow card) 76'	Stadium: York Lions Stadium; Attendance: 1,012; Referee: Filip Dujic

June 26 12	York United FC	1–3	Valour FC	Toronto, Ontario
12:00pm	De Rosario 52'; Verhoeven (yellow card) 58'	Report	Akio (yellow card) 13'; Romeo (yellow card) 48'; Riggi 51'; Dyer 72'; Rea 89' (yellow card) 90+4'	Stadium: York Lions Stadium; Attendance: 1,002; Referee: Scott Bowman

July 1 13	FC Edmonton	3–0	York United FC	Edmonton, Alberta
6:00pm	Bissainte 24'; Camara 57' (yellow card) 58'; Bitar 59'	Report	Ferrari (yellow card) 71'; Wilson (yellow card) 75'; Johnston (yellow card) 90'	Stadium: Clarke Stadium; Attendance: 1,133; Referee: Renzo Villanueva

July 8 14	York United FC	0–2	Forge FC	Toronto, Ontario
7:30pm	Mourdoukoutas (yellow card) 37'; Wilson (yellow card) 48'; Johnston (yellow card) 88'; Hernández (yellow card) 90+1'	Report	Mourdoukoutas 29' (o.g.); Borges (yellow card) 45+1'; Campbell (yellow card) 59'; Morgan (yellow card) 70'; Pacius 77'	Stadium: York Lions Stadium; Attendance: 1,302; Referee: Ben Hoskins

July 15 15	York United FC	2–4	Pacific FC	Toronto, Ontario
7:30pm	Kratt 1'; Giantsopoulos (yellow card) 31'; De Rosario 49'; Toussaint (yellow card) 56'; Ferrari (yellow card) 74'	Report	Daniels (yellow card) 31'; Diaz 42' (pen.), 63', 70'; Young (yellow card) 65'; Heard (yellow card) 72'; Dixon (yellow card) 85'; dos Santos 87', (yellow card) 90+4'	Stadium: York Lions Stadium; Attendance: 1,030; Referee: Fabrizio Stasolla

July 19 16	Cavalry FC	0–1	York United FC	Calgary, Alberta
9:30pm	Di Chiara (yellow card) 50'	Report	De Rosario 29'; Wilson (yellow card) 30' (yellow-red card) 51'; Giantsopoulos (yellow card) 75'; Johnston (yellow card) 90+5'	Stadium: ATCO Field; Attendance: 2,943; Referee: Scott Bowman

July 24 17	York United FC	0–3	Atlético Ottawa	Toronto, Ontario
2:00pm	Thompson (yellow card) 62'	Report	Tabla 11' (pen.); Wright 35'; Bassett 62' (pen.); Bahous (yellow card) 90+1'	Stadium: York Lions Stadium; Attendance: 1,187; Referee: Seyed-Mohammed Mohseni

August 1 18	HFX Wanderers FC	2–4	York United FC	Halifax, Nova Scotia
2:00pm	Santos 66'; Garcia 86' (pen.)	Report	Wilson 15'; De Rosario 34' 69'; Hernández (yellow card) 36'; Zator (yellow card) 45+2'; Lawrie-Lattanzio 50' (yellow card) 60'; N'sa (yellow card) 86'	Stadium: Wanderers Grounds; Attendance: 5,749; Referee: Fabrizio Stasolla

August 7 19	Valour FC	2–0	York United FC	Winnipeg, Manitoba
5:00pm	Rea 46'; Levis (yellow card) 53'; Forbes 70'	Report		Stadium: IG Field; Attendance: 2,907; Referee: Alain Ruch

August 14 20	York United FC	3–2	FC Edmonton	Toronto, Ontario
4:00pm	Kratt 10'; De Rosario (yellow card) 56'; Cabrera 80'; Wilson 84'; Lawrie-Lattanzio (yellow card) 88'; Gutiérrez (yellow card) 90+5'	Report	Bitar 62'; Gonzalez 78'; Loughrey (yellow card) 88'	Stadium: York Lions Stadium; Attendance: 1,345; Referee: Yusri Rudolf

August 20 21	Forge FC	1–3	York United FC	Hamilton, Ontario
7:00pm	Borges 52' (yellow card) 69'; Bekker (yellow card) 70'; Morgan (yellow card) 89'	Report	De Rosario 7'; Verhoeven (yellow card) 27'; Hernández (yellow card) 40'; N'sa 58' (yellow card) 61'; Babouli 68'	Stadium: Tim Hortons Field; Attendance: 3,867; Referee: Marie-Soleil Beaudoin

August 27 22	Cavalry FC	1–0	York United FC	Calgary, Alberta
3:30pm	Cantave (yellow card) 33'; Norman Jr. (yellow card) 37'; Escalante 55'; Simmons (yellow card) 59'; Assi (yellow card) 87'	Report	Lawrie-Lattanzio (yellow card) 63'	Stadium: ATCO Field; Attendance: 3,401; Referee: Myriam Marcotte

September 3 23	Pacific FC	1–3	York United FC	Langford, British Columbia
5:00pm	Dada-Luke 31'	Report	Wilson (yellow card) 22'; Babouli 48'; De Rosario 57'; Gutiérrez 81'	Stadium: Starlight Stadium; Attendance: 3,133; Referee: Alain Ruch

September 9 24	York United FC	3–1	FC Edmonton	Toronto, Ontario
7:30pm	Babouli 13' 71' (pen.); De Rosario 48' (yellow card) 49'; dos Santos (yellow card) 62'	Report	Higgins (yellow card) 30'; Smith 54'; Bissainte (yellow card) 76'	Stadium: York Lions Stadium; Attendance: 1,243; Referee: Myriam Marcotte

September 16 25	York United FC	0–0	HFX Wanderers	Toronto, Ontario
7:30pm	Thompson (yellow card) 8'; Verhoeven (yellow card) 11'	Report	Lamothe (yellow card) 50'; Gagnon-Laparé (yellow card) 85'; Baskett (yellow card) 88'; Tabi (yellow card) 89'	Stadium: York Lions Stadium; Attendance: 1,525; Referee: Seyed-Mohammed Mohseni

September 23 26	York United FC	3–1	Valour FC	Toronto, Ontario
7:30pm	Babouli 34'; N'sa 56'; Lawrie-Lattanzio 75'	Report	Cebara 16' (pen.); Romeo (yellow card) 44'; Rendón (yellow card) 90+2'	Stadium: York Lions Stadium; Attendance: 1,402

October 1 27	Forge FC	2–0	York United FC	Hamilton, Ontario
5:00pm	Pacius (yellow card) 31'; Owolabi-Belewu 55'; Sissoko 69'	Report	Baldisimo (yellow card) 89'	Stadium: Tim Hortons Field; Attendance: 5,129; Referee: Marie-Soleil Beaudoin

October 9 28	Atlético Ottawa	2–2	York United FC	Ottawa, Ontario
4:00pm	Haworth (yellow card) 23'; Tissot 25'; Wright 43'; Beckie (yellow card) 58'; Alemán (yellow card) 72'	Report	dos Santos (yellow card) 11'; Mourdoukoutas (yellow card) 55'; De Rosario 62' (yellow card) 63'; Wilson 79'	Stadium: TD Place Stadium; Attendance: 4,303; Referee: Alain Ruch

=== Canadian Championship ===
May 10 Preliminary round	Atlético Ottawa	1–1 (6–7 p)	York United FC	Ottawa, Ontario
7:00pm	Acosta (yellow card) 21'; Shaw 61'; Moragrega (yellow card) 67'	Report	Abzi 31'; Wilson (yellow card) 45+3'; Toussaint (yellow card) 53'; N'sa (yellow card) 81'	Stadium: TD Place Stadium; Referee: Pierre-Luc Lauzière
	Penalties
	Haworth (penalty scored); Wright (penalty missed); Shaw (penalty scored); Alemán (penalty scored); Bassett (penalty scored); Sissoko (penalty scored); Beckie (penalty scored); McKendry (penalty missed)		(penalty missed) De Rosario; (penalty scored) Abzi; (penalty scored) Zator; (penalty scored) Wilson; (penalty scored) Hernández; (penalty scored) Johnston; (penalty scored) Jesus; (penalty scored) Toussaint
Note: York United FC's goalkeeper coach Benzi Camilo was sent off (red card) in the 88th minute for violent conduct.

May 24 Quarter-finals	Pacific FC	2–2 (3–4 p)	York United FC	Langford, British Columbia
10:00pm	Đidić 11'; Daniels (yellow card) 79'; Heard (yellow card) 82'; Đidić 90+7'; Đidić (yellow card) 90+8'	Report	Verhoeven (yellow card) 13'; Thompson 25'; N'sa (yellow card) 29'; De Rosario 31'; Zator (yellow card) 36'; Gutiérrez (yellow card) 45'; Johnston (yellow card) 57'; Hernández (yellow card) 90'; Giantsopoulos (yellow card) 90+11'	Stadium: Starlight Stadium; Referee: Filip Dujic
	Penalties
	Meilleur-Giguère (penalty scored); Díaz (penalty missed); dos Santos (penalty scored); Daniels (penalty scored); Bustos (penalty missed)		(penalty scored) Abzi; (penalty scored) Zator; (penalty scored) Hernández; (penalty missed) Eduardo; (penalty scored) Wilson

June 22 Semi-finals	Vancouver Whitecaps FC	2–1	York United FC	Vancouver, British Columbia
10:00pm	White 53', 74'	Report	Toussaint (yellow card) 22'; Johnston 84'	Stadium: BC Place; Referee: Juan Marquez

== Statistics ==
=== Squad and statistics ===
As of October 9, 2022

No.	Pos	Nat	Player	Total		Canadian Premier League		Canadian Championship	
No.	Pos	Nat	Player	Apps	Goals	Apps	Goals	Apps	Goals
Goalkeepers
1	GK	(Canada) CAN	Niko Giantsopoulos	21	0	18+0	0	3+0	0
12	GK	(Canada) CAN	Gianluca Catalano	1	0	1+0	0	0+0	0
67	GK	(Canada) CAN	Eleias Himaras	10	0	9+1	0	0+0	0
Defenders
2	DF	(Brazil) BRA	Eduardo Jesus	17	0	5+9	0	1+2	0
3	DF	(Australia) AUS	Tass Mourdoukoutas	15	0	15+0	0	0+0	0
3	DF	(Denmark) DEN	Daniel Obbekjær	1	0	0+1	0	0+0	0
5	DF	(Canada) CAN	Dominick Zator	31	1	28+0	1	3+0	0
6	DF	(Canada) CAN	Roger Thompson	15	1	12+2	0	1+0	1
14	DF	(Canada) CAN	Paris Gee	8	0	5+3	0	0+0	0
20	DF	(Canada) CAN	Diyaeddine Abzi	13	1	9+1	0	3+0	1
66	DF	(Canada) CAN	Chrisnovic N'sa	30	2	27+0	2	3+0	0
Midfielders
4	MF	(Canada) CAN	Jordan Wilson	29	3	26+0	3	3+0	0
7	MF	(Canada) CAN	Oliver Minatel	6	1	3+3	1	0+0	0
8	MF	(Colombia) COL	Sebastian Gutierrez	18	2	8+8	2	2+0	0
10	MF	(Argentina) ARG	Mateo Hernández	19	0	12+4	0	2+1	0
11	MF	(Portugal) POR	Kevin Dos Santos	14	0	11+3	0	0+0	0
16	MF	(Canada) CAN	Max Ferrari	14	0	6+7	0	1+0	0
19	MF	(Canada) CAN	Noah Verhoeven	27	0	21+3	0	2+1	0
21	MF	(Canada) CAN	Michael Petrasso	13	0	5+8	0	0+0	0
28	MF	(Canada) CAN	Cédric Toussaint	17	0	7+7	0	2+1	0
33	MF	(Canada) CAN	Matthew Baldisimo	3	0	1+2	0	0+0	0
44	MF	(Canada) CAN	Isaiah Johnston	22	1	16+3	0	2+1	1
99	MF	(Brazil) BRA	William Wallace	2	0	0+2	0	0+0	0
Forwards
9	FW	(Argentina) ARG	Lisandro Cabrera	23	1	7+14	1	1+1	0
11	FW	(Czech Republic) CZE	Martin Graiciar	0	0	0+0	0	0+0	0
17	FW	(Canada) CAN	Mouhamadou Kane	12	0	2+8	0	0+2	0
18	FW	(Canada) CAN	Molham Babouli	8	5	7+1	5	0+0	0
22	FW	(Canada) CAN	Austin Ricci	4	0	0+3	0	0+1	0
24	FW	(United States) USA	Osaze De Rosario	30	13	24+3	12	3+0	1
25	FW	(Australia) AUS	Luis Lawrie-Lattanzio	12	2	6+6	2	0+0	0
27	FW	(Canada) CAN	Ronan Kratt	14	2	11+3	2	0+0	0
80	FW	(Canada) CAN	Lowell Wright	11	0	6+3	0	2+0	0
98	FW	(Canada) CAN	Cyrus Rollocks	2	0	0+2	0	0+0	0

=== Top scorers ===
Rank	Nat.	Player	Pos.	Canadian Premier League	Canadian Championship	TOTAL
1	(United States)	Osaze De Rosario	FW	12	1	13
2	(Canada)	Molham Babouli	FW	5	0	5
3	(Canada)	Jordan Wilson	MF	3	0	3
4	(Colombia)	Sebastian Gutierrez	MF	2	0	2
4	(Canada)	Ronan Kratt	FW	2	0	2
4	(Australia)	Luis Lawrie-Lattanzio	FW	2	0	2
4	(Canada)	Chrisnovic N'sa	DF	2	0	2
5	(Canada)	Diyaeddine Abzi	DF	0	1	1
5	(Argentina)	Lisandro Cabrera	FW	1	0	1
5	(Canada)	Isaiah Johnston	MF	0	1	1
5	(Canada)	Oliver Minatel	MF	1	0	1
5	(Canada)	Roger Thompson	DF	0	1	1
5	(Canada)	Dominick Zator	DF	1	0	1
Totals				31	4	35

Updated to match played October 9, 2022
Source: Canadian Premier League

=== Top assists ===
Rank	Nat.	Player	Pos.	Canadian Premier League	Canadian Championship	TOTAL
1	(United States)	Osaze De Rosario	FW	3	0	3
1	(Canada)	Isaiah Johnston	MF	3	0	3
1	(Canada)	Chrisnovic N'sa	DF	3	0	3
2	(Canada)	Diyaeddine Abzi	DF	1	1	2
2	(Canada)	Molham Babouli	FW	2	0	2
2	(Canada)	Paris Gee	DF	2	0	2
2	(Canada)	Noah Verhoeven	MF	2	0	2
2	(Canada)	Lowell Wright	FW	0	2	2
3	(Portugal)	Kevin Dos Santos	MF	1	0	1
3	(Colombia)	Sebastian Gutierrez	MF	1	0	1
3	(Argentina)	Mateo Hernández	MF	1	0	1
3	(Canada)	Mouhamadou Kane	MF	0	1	1
3	(Canada)	Ronan Kratt	FW	1	0	1
3	(Australia)	Luis Lawrie-Lattanzio	FW	1	0	1
3	(Canada)	Cédric Toussaint	MF	1	0	1
3	(Canada)	Dominick Zator	DF	1	0	1
Totals				23	4	27

Updated to match played October 9, 2022
Source: Canadian Premier League

=== Clean sheets ===
Rank	Nat.	Player	Canadian Premier League	Canadian Championship	TOTAL
1	(Canada)	Niko Giantsopoulos	6	0	6
2	(Canada)	Eleias Himaras	1	0	1
Totals			7	0	7

Updated to match played October 9, 2022
Source: Canadian Premier League

=== Disciplinary record ===
No.	Pos.	Nat.	Player	Canadian Premier League		Canadian Championship		TOTAL	
No.	Pos.	Nat.	Player	Yellow card	Red card	Yellow card	Red card	Yellow card	Red card
1	GK	(Canada)	Niko Giantsopoulos	3	0	0	0	3	0
3	DF	(Australia)	Tass Mourdoukoutas	2	0	0	0	2	0
4	MF	(Canada)	Jordan Wilson	7	1	1	0	8	1
5	DF	(Canada)	Dominick Zator	2	0	1	0	3	0
6	DF	(Canada)	Roger Thompson	3	0	0	0	3	0
8	MF	(Colombia)	Sebastian Gutierrez	2	0	1	0	3	0
9	FW	(Argentina)	Lisandro Cabrera	1	0	0	0	1	0
10	MF	(Argentina)	Mateo Hernández	6	1	1	0	7	1
11	MF	(Portugal)	Kevin Dos Santos	2	0	1	0	2	0
16	MF	(Canada)	Max Ferrari	2	0	0	0	2	0
17	FW	(Canada)	Mouhamadou Kane	1	0	0	0	1	0
19	MF	(Canada)	Noah Verhoeven	4	0	1	0	5	0
20	DF	(Canada)	Diyaeddine Abzi	5	0	0	0	5	0
22	FW	(Canada)	Austin Ricci	1	0	0	0	1	0
24	FW	(United States)	Osaze De Rosario	5	0	0	0	5	0
25	FW	(Australia)	Luis Lawrie-Lattanzio	3	0	0	0	3	0
28	MF	(Canada)	Cédric Toussaint	3	2	2	0	5	2
33	MF	(Canada)	Matthew Baldisimo	1	0	0	0	1	0
44	MF	(Canada)	Isaiah Johnston	8	0	1	0	9	0
66	DF	(Canada)	Chrisnovic N'sa	5	1	2	0	7	1
80	FW	(Canada)	Lowell Wright	1	0	0	0	1	0
Totals				67	5	10	0	77	5

Updated to match played October 9, 2022
Source: Canadian Premier League
