= 2022 Canadian Championship =

Soccer tournament season

Championnat Canadien 2022

Tournament details
- Country: Canada
- Date: May 10 – July 26
- Teams: 13 (from 4 leagues)

Final positions
- Champions: Vancouver Whitecaps FC (2nd title)
- Runners-up: Toronto FC

Tournament statistics
- Matches played: 12
- Goals scored: 32 (2.67 per match)
- Attendance: 90,082 (7,507 per match)
- Top goal scorer(s): Myer Bevan; Sunusi Ibrahim; Brian White (3 goals each)

Awards
- George Gross Memorial Trophy: Ryan Gauld
- Best young player: Ryan Raposo

The 2022 Canadian Championship was the fifteenth edition of Canada's national soccer cup tournament, awarding the Voyageurs Cup. It took place from May 10 to July 26, 2022. The winners of the tournament, Vancouver Whitecaps FC, were awarded the Voyageurs Cup and earned a berth in the 2023 CONCACAF Champions League.

== Format ==
The competition followed a similar format to the 2021 edition with ten teams starting in the preliminary round and three teams receiving byes to the quarter-finals. CF Montréal and Toronto FC received byes for being the finalists of the 2021 tournament and Pacific FC received a bye for winning the 2021 Canadian Premier League season. Each tie of the four round tournament was played as a single-leg fixture.

=== Distribution ===
Distribution of teams for 2022 Canadian Championship
Round	Teams entering in this round	Teams advancing from previous round
Preliminary round (10 teams)	1 champion of 2021 League1 Ontario season; 1 champion of 2021 Première ligue de soccer du Québec season; 7 Canadian Premier League teams; 1 Major League Soccer team	
Quarter-finals (8 teams)	1 winner of the 2021 Canadian Premier League season; 2 finalists of the 2021 Canadian Championship	5 winners from the preliminary round
Semi-finals (4 teams)		4 winners from the quarter-finals
Final (2 teams)		2 winners from the semi-finals

== Teams ==
Qualification to the Canadian Championship for 2022 was automatic for Canadian teams within Major League Soccer and for all teams within the Canadian Premier League, Canada's tier-one national league. The champions from Canada's two regional pro-am leagues (League1 Ontario and PLSQ) also qualified.

2022 Canadian Championship (Canada)
Montreal area clubs: CF Montréal; CS Mont-Royal Outremont
Toronto area clubs: Toronto FC; York United FC

Canadian Premier League Major League Soccer Other

Team	Location	League	Round of entry	Previous best	Prior appearances
Atlético Ottawa	Ottawa, Ontario	Canadian Premier League	Preliminary round	Preliminary round: 1	1
Cavalry FC	Foothills County, Alberta	Canadian Premier League	Preliminary round	Semi-finals: 1	2
FC Edmonton	Edmonton, Alberta	Canadian Premier League	Preliminary round	Semi-finals: 5	9
Forge FC	Hamilton, Ontario	Canadian Premier League	Preliminary round	Runner-up: 1	3
Guelph United FC	Guelph, Ontario	League1 Ontario	Preliminary round	first appearance	0
HFX Wanderers FC	Halifax, Nova Scotia	Canadian Premier League	Preliminary round	Quarter-finals: 1	2
CF Montréal	Montreal, Quebec	Major League Soccer	Quarter-finals	Champions: 5	13
CS Mont-Royal Outremont	Mount Royal, Quebec	Québec Premier League	Preliminary round	first appearance	0
Pacific FC	Langford, British Columbia	Canadian Premier League	Quarter-finals	Semi-finals: 1	2
Toronto FC	Toronto, Ontario	Major League Soccer	Quarter-finals	Champions: 8	14
Valour FC	Winnipeg, Manitoba	Canadian Premier League	Preliminary round	Quarter-finals: 1	2
Vancouver Whitecaps FC	Vancouver, British Columbia	Major League Soccer	Preliminary round	Champions: 1	13
York United FC	Toronto, Ontario	Canadian Premier League	Preliminary round	Quarter-finals: 1	2

Note

- Statistics include previous incarnations of FC Edmonton, Montreal Impact, and Vancouver Whitecaps
- Results from the 2020 Canadian Championship are included for Toronto FC and Forge FC even though the championship was played after the start of the 2022 edition

== Schedule and draw ==
Teams were divided into four geographical pots for the draw. In the preliminary round, teams in pot 1 were drawn with teams in pot 1 while teams in pot 2 were drawn with a team in pot 2 or pot 3. For the quarter-finals, the winners from pot 1 faced off while the winners from pot 2 and 3 were drawn against teams from pot 4. The draw also determined hosting rights for all four rounds.

Pot 1 (West)	Pot 2 (East)	Pot 3 (East)	Pot 4 (Bye)
Vancouver Whitecaps FC; Cavalry FC; FC Edmonton; Valour FC	Forge FC; York United FC; Atlético Ottawa; HFX Wanderers FC	Guelph United FC; CS Mont-Royal Outremont	Pacific FC; Toronto FC; CF Montréal

Schedule
Round	Date
First round	May 10–11
Quarter-finals	May 24–25
Semi-finals	June 21
Final	July 26

== Bracket ==
The draw for the Canadian Championship was streamed live on OneSoccer on March 9, 2022.

Preliminary round May 10–11
Foothills County, AB
CPL	Cavalry FC	2
CPL	FC Edmonton	1
Vancouver, BC
MLS	Vancouver Whitecaps FC	2
CPL	Valour FC	0
Ottawa, ON
CPL	Atlético Ottawa	1 (6)
CPL	York United FC (p)	1 (7)
Guelph, ON
L1O	Guelph United FC	0
CPL	HFX Wanderers FC	2
Hamilton, ON
CPL	Forge FC	2
PLSQ	CS Mont-Royal Outremont	0

Quarter-finals; May 24–25
Foothills County, AB
CPL	Cavalry FC	1 (3)
MLS	Vancouver Whitecaps FC (p)	1 (5)
Langford, BC
CPL	Pacific FC	2 (3)
CPL	York United FC (p)	2 (4)
Halifax, NS
CPL	HFX Wanderers FC	1
MLS	Toronto FC	2
Montreal, QC
MLS	CF Montréal	3
CPL	Forge FC	0

Semi-finals; June 22
Vancouver, BC
MLS	Vancouver Whitecaps FC	2
CPL	York United FC	1
Toronto (BMO), ON
MLS	Toronto FC	4
MLS	CF Montréal	0

Final; July 26
Vancouver, BC
MLS	Vancouver Whitecaps FC	1 (5)
MLS	Toronto FC	1 (3)

== Preliminary round ==
=== Summary ===
The preliminary round matches were played on May 10 and 11, 2022.

Team 1	Score	Team 2
Guelph United FC	0–2	HFX Wanderers FC
Atlético Ottawa	1–1 (6–7 p)	York United FC
Cavalry FC	2–1	FC Edmonton
Forge FC	2–0	CS Mont-Royal Outremont
Vancouver Whitecaps FC	2–0	Valour FC

=== Matches ===
May 10
7:00 pm EDT

Guelph United FC	0–2	HFX Wanderers FC
	Report	García 22' (pen.); Daniels 61'

Alumni Stadium, Guelph, Ontario
Attendance: 1,728
Referee: Filip Dujic

May 10
7:00 pm EDT

Atlético Ottawa	1–1	York United FC
Shaw 61'	Report	Abzi 31'
Penalties
Haworth (penalty scored); Wright (penalty missed); Shaw (penalty scored); Alemán (penalty scored); Bassett (penalty scored); Sissoko (penalty scored); Beckie (penalty scored); McKendry (penalty missed)	6–7	(penalty missed) De Rosario; (penalty scored) Abzi; (penalty scored) Zator; (penalty scored) Wilson; (penalty scored) Hernández; (penalty scored) Johnston; (penalty scored) Eduardo; (penalty scored) Toussaint

TD Place Stadium, Ottawa, Ontario
Attendance: 1,893
Referee: Pierre-Luc Lauzière

May 10
7:30 pm MDT
(9:30 pm UTC−4)

Cavalry FC	2–1	FC Edmonton
Bevan 17', 36' (pen.)	Report	Warschewski 55' (pen.)

ATCO Field, Foothills County, Alberta
Attendance: 2,229
Referee: Juan Marquez

May 11
7:00 pm EDT

Forge FC	2–0	CS Mont-Royal Outremont
Campbell 34'; Pacius 90+2'	Report

Tim Hortons Field, Hamilton, Ontario
Attendance: 2,213
Referee: Yusri Rudolf

May 11
7:00 pm PDT
(10:00 pm UTC−4)

Vancouver Whitecaps FC	2–0	Valour FC
Teibert 19'; Raposo 22'	Report

BC Place, Vancouver, British Columbia
Attendance: 7,803
Referee: Alain Ruch

== Quarter-finals ==
=== Summary ===
The quarter-final matches were played on May 24 and 25, 2022.

Team 1	Score	Team 2
Cavalry FC	1–1 (3–5 p)	Vancouver Whitecaps FC
Pacific FC	2–2 (3–4 p)	York United FC
CF Montréal	3–0	Forge FC
HFX Wanderers FC	1–2	Toronto FC

=== Matches ===
May 24
7:00 pm ADT
(6:00 pm UTC−4)

HFX Wanderers FC	1–2	Toronto FC
Salter 69'	Report	Bradley 55'; Osorio 87'

Wanderers Grounds, Halifax, Nova Scotia
Attendance: 6,507
Referee: Juan Marquez

May 24
7:00 pm PDT
(10:00 pm UTC−4)

Pacific FC	2–2	York United FC
Đidić 12', 90+6'	Report	Thompson 26'; De Rosario 31'
Penalties
Díaz (penalty missed); Meilleur-Giguère (penalty scored); Dos Santos (penalty scored); Daniels (penalty scored); Bustos (penalty missed)	3–4	(penalty scored) Abzi; (penalty scored) Zator; (penalty scored) Hernández; (penalty missed) Eduardo; (penalty scored) Wilson

Starlight Stadium, Langford, British Columbia
Attendance: 1,462
Referee: Filip Dujic

May 25
7:00 pm EDT

CF Montréal	3–0	Forge FC
Ibrahim 14', 22', 49'	Report

Saputo Stadium, Montreal, Quebec
Attendance: 10,107
Referee: Pierre-Luc Lauzière

May 25
7:00 pm MDT
(9:00 pm UTC−4)

Cavalry FC	1–1	Vancouver Whitecaps FC
Bevan 72'	Report	Klomp 80' (o.g.)
Penalties
Bevan (penalty scored); Escalante (penalty scored); Simmons (penalty scored); Musse (penalty missed)	3–5	(penalty scored) Cavallini; (penalty scored) Caicedo; (penalty scored) Dájome; (penalty scored) Owusu; (penalty scored) Gutiérrez

ATCO Field, Foothills County, Alberta
Attendance: 3,197
Referee: Yusri Rudolf

== Semi-finals ==
=== Summary ===
The semi-final matches were played on June 22, 2022.

Team 1	Score	Team 2
Vancouver Whitecaps FC	2–1	York United FC
Toronto FC	4–0	CF Montréal

=== Matches ===
June 22
7:00 pm EDT

Toronto FC	4–0	CF Montréal
Akinola 40', 54'; Jiménez 75'; Pozuelo 78'	Report

BMO Field, Toronto, Ontario
Attendance: 18,133
Referee: Yusri Rudolf

June 22
7:00 pm PDT
(10:00 pm UTC−4)

Vancouver Whitecaps FC	2–1	York United
White 53', 74'	Report	Johnston 84'

BC Place, Vancouver, British Columbia
Attendance: 10,503
Referee: Juan Marquez

== Final ==
July 26, 2022
7:30 pm PDT
(10:30 pm UTC−4)

Vancouver Whitecaps FC	1–1	Toronto FC
White 19'	Report	MacNaughton 75'
Penalties
Gauld (penalty scored); White (penalty scored); Gressel (penalty scored); Cubas (penalty scored); Blackmon (penalty scored)	5–3	(penalty scored) Criscito; (penalty scored) Perruzza; (penalty missed) Osorio; (penalty scored) Bernardeschi

BC Place, Vancouver, British Columbia
Attendance: 24,307
Referee: Pierre-Luc Lauzière

== Top goalscorers ==
Team eliminated or did not play in this round.

Rank	Player	Team	Goals	By round			
Rank	Player	Team	Goals	PR	QF	SF	F
1	(New Zealand) Myer Bevan	Cavalry FC	3	2	1		
1	(Nigeria) Sunusi Ibrahim	CF Montréal	3		3		
1	(United States) Brian White	Vancouver Whitecaps FC	3			2	1
4	(Canada) Ayo Akinola	Toronto FC	2			2	
4	(Canada) Amer Đidić	Pacific FC	2		2		

=== Own goals ===
- 1 own goal - (Netherlands national football team) Daan Klomp

== Awards ==
- George Gross Memorial Trophy: (Scotland) Ryan Gauld (Vancouver Whitecaps FC)
- Best Young Canadian Player Award: (Canada) Ryan Raposo (Vancouver Whitecaps FC)

== Discipline ==
=== Cautions ===
Team eliminated or did not play in specific round
Suspension due to yellow card accumulation
Suspension due to red card

Rank	Player	Team	Cautions	By round			
Rank	Player	Team	Cautions	PR	QF	SF	F
1	(Canada) Alessandro Hojabrpour	Forge FC	2	1	1		
1	(Canada) Chrisnovic N'sa	York United FC	2	1	1	YCA	
1	(Mali) Aboubacar Sissoko	Forge FC	2	1	1		
1	(Canada) Cédric Toussaint	York United FC	2	1		1	
1	(Canada) Charlie Trafford	Cavalry FC	2	1	1		
6	(Canada) Ayo Akinola	Toronto FC	1		1		
6	(United States) Michael Bradley	Toronto FC	1				1
6	(Jamaica) Javain Brown	Vancouver Whitecaps FC	1		1		
6	(Canada) Michael Baldisimo	Vancouver Whitecaps FC	1		1		
6	(United States) Sebastian Berhalter	Vancouver Whitecaps FC	1		1		
6	(Canada) Zachary Brault-Guillard	CF Montréal	1		1		
6	(France) Rudy Camacho	CF Montréal	1			1	
6	(Canada) Lucas Cavallini	Vancouver Whitecaps FC	1	1			
6	(Canada) Niko Giantsopoulos	York United FC	1		1		
6	(Colombia) Sebastián Gutiérrez	York United FC	1		1		
6	(Argentina) Mateo Hernández	York United FC	1		1		
6	(Canada) Isaiah Johnston	York United FC	1		1		
6	(Argentina) Matko Miljevic	CF Montréal	1			1	
6	(United States) Shane O'Neill	Toronto FC	1		1		
6	(Canada) Ralph Priso	Toronto FC	1		1		
6	(Argentina) Joaquín Torres	CF Montréal	1			1	
6	(Canada) Noah Verhoeven	York United FC	1		1		
6	(Serbia) Ranko Veselinović	Vancouver Whitecaps FC	1		1		
6	(Canada) Jordan Wilson	York United FC	1	1			
6	(Canada) Dominick Zator	York United FC	1		1		

Note: Players received a one-match ban for yellow card accumulation based on two cautions in Canadian Championship.

=== Sending offs ===
No.	Date	Player	Team	Offence
1	May 10	(Canada) Camilo Benzi (Note: Coaching staff)	York United FC	Violent conduct
