= Mamadou Kane =

Mamadou Kane may refer to:

- Mamadou Kané (footballer, born 1997), Guinean footballer
- Mamadou Kane (soccer, born 2003), Canadian soccer player
