= Matthew Nogueira =

Canadian soccer player

Personal information
- Full name: Matthew Alexander Pires Nogueira
- Date of birth: March 18, 1998 (age 28)
- Place of birth: Toronto, Ontario, Canada
- Height: 1.91 m (6 ft 3 in)
- Position: Goalkeeper

Team information
- Current team: Scrosoppi FC

Youth career
- Sporting Academy Toronto
- 2012–2015: Benfica
- 2015–2016: Toronto FC
- 2016–2017: Gil Vicente

Senior career*
Years	Team	Apps	(Gls)
2016–2017	Gil Vicente	0	(0)
2017–2018	Fornos de Algodres	4	(0)
2018	Águeda	6	(0)
2018–2021	Marítimo	0	(0)
2018–2021	Marítimo B	8	(0)
2022	York United	0	(0)
2026–	Scrosoppi FC	1	(0)

International career
2014	Canada U16		
- * Club domestic league appearances and goals as of April 20, 2026

Matthew Alexander Pires Nogueira (born March 18, 1998) is a Canadian professional soccer player who plays as a goalkeeper for Scrosoppi FC in the Ontario Premier League.

== Early life ==
He began playing soccer at age 4 with Sporting Academy Toronto, an affiliate of Portuguese club Sporting CP. When he was 10, he was noticed by Portuguese goalkeeper Nuno Santos, who was running camps in Canada, who trained him and arranged trials for him in Portugal with the Benfica and Sporting youth academies, with Nogueira ultimately joining Benfica. He later returned to Toronto ahead of the birth of his daughter, and reached out to Toronto FC who invited him to join their academy, with whom he spent a year and also trialed with Toronto FC II. Afterwards, he returned to Portugal, joining the youth setup of Gil Vicente.

== Club career ==
On October 8, 2016, he was an unused substitute for the Gil Vicente first-team against Olhanense.

In 2017, he joined A.D. Fornos de Algodres in the third tier Campeonato de Portugal. Initially serving as the backup keeper, he eventually received his opportunity as the team fell into last place, and in a match against league-leaders Águeda, he put in a man of the match performance, attracting Águeda's interest who signed him to a contract. Once again finding himself as the backup, he once again received a string of starts at the end of the season, including in the final match of the season against Marítimo B, where he played well despite dislocating his finger prior to the match, impressing Marítimo, who signed him to a three-year contract in the offseason. In his first season, he split time between the B team, the U23 team, and the first team, including his professional debut in a 2018–19 Taça da Liga league cup match against Estoril Praia, losing 1-0 with the goal coming from a penalty kick.

Upon the expiry of his contract, he joined Serbian second tier side FK Zlatibor Čajetina, but would have had to wait until January 2022 to officially sign as the club underwent a transfer ban on foreign signings due to a penalty from failing to pay its players when they were in the top division, however, he instead left the club to return to Canada, where he went on trial with Major League Soccer club CF Montréal and Canadian Premier League club York United FC. On March 10, 2022, after his trial, he signed a one-year contract plus options with York. In July 2022, he terminated his contract with York United via mutual consent.

== International career ==
Born in Canada, Nogueira is of Portuguese descent. Nogueira was called up to a camp for the Canada U16 in 2014. He appeared for Canada U16 at the 2014 Montaigu Tournament, making his debut against France.

Nogueira was named to the Canadian U-23 50-man provisional roster for the 2020 CONCACAF Men's Olympic Qualifying Championship on February 26, 2021. He was named to the final squad ahead of the rescheduled tournament on March 10, 2021.

== Career statistics ==
As of August 1, 2022

Club	Season	League			Domestic Cup		League Cup		Continental		Total	
Club	Season	Division	Apps	Goals	Apps	Goals	Apps	Goals	Apps	Goals	Apps	Goals
Gil Vicente	2016–17	LigaPro	0	0	0	0	0	0	–		0	0
Fornos de Algodres	2017–18	Campeonato de Portugal	4	0	0	0	–		–		4	0
Águeda	2017–18	Campeonato de Portugal	6	0	0	0	–		–		6	0
Marítimo	2018–19	Primeira Liga	0	0	0	0	1 (Note: Appearance in the Taça da Liga)	0	–		1	0
Marítimo B	2018–19	Campeonato de Portugal	5	0	–		–		–		5	0
Marítimo B	2019–20	Campeonato de Portugal	3	0	–		–		–		3	0
Marítimo B	Total		8	0	—		—		—		8	0
York United FC	2022	Canadian Premier League	0	0	0	0	–		–		0	0
Career total			18	0	0	0	1	0	0	0	19	0
