= Eleias Himaras =

Canadian soccer player (born 2002)

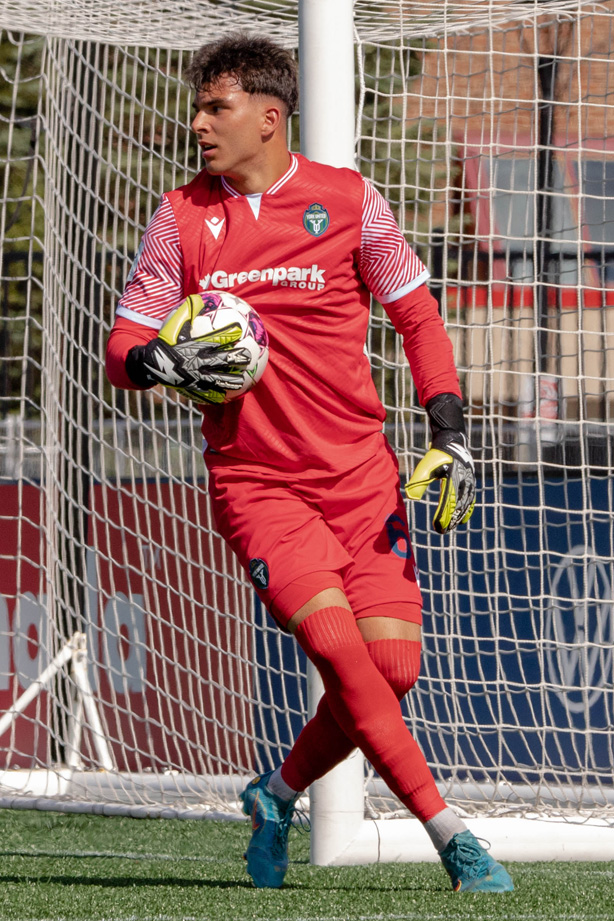
- Himaras with York United in 2022

Personal information
- Full name: Eleias Konstantinos Himaras
- Date of birth: March 8, 2002 (age 24)
- Place of birth: London, Ontario, Canada
- Height: 1.85 m (6 ft 1 in)
- Position: Goalkeeper

Youth career
- London NorWest Optimist SC
- London Alliance FC
- London Portuguese Fury
- 2018–2020: Toronto FC

Senior career*
Years	Team	Apps	(Gls)
2018	Toronto FC III	1	(0)
2019	Toronto FC II	0	(0)
2021	FC London	10	(0)
2021	→ York United (loan)	0	(0)
2022	Electric City FC	3	(0)
2022–2024	York United	12	(0)
2025	Valour FC	9	(0)
2026–	Pacific FC	15	(0)

International career^{‡}
2019	Canada U17	1	(0)
- * Club domestic league appearances and goals as of October 25, 2026 ‡ National team caps and goals as of July 18, 2022

Eleias Konstantinos Himaras (born March 8, 2002) is a Canadian soccer player who plays as a goalkeeper for Pacific FC in the Canadian Premier League.

== Early life ==
Himaras began playing youth soccer at age five with London NorWest Optimist SC. He later joined London Alliance FC at age seven for a year, before joining London Portuguese Fury. He later joined the Toronto FC Academy in 2018.

== Club career ==
On September 18, 2018, he made his senior debut at age sixteen with Toronto FC III in League1 Ontario in a 6–0 loss to Vaughan Azzurri. In 2019, he served as a reserve keeper with Toronto FC II in USL League One, but did not appear in any matches. After Toronto FC II withdrew from the 2020 season due to the COVID-19 pandemic, Himaras returned to his hometown of London, Ontario to train.

In 2021, he played with FC London in League1 Ontario, appearing in 10 of the team's 11 matches, winning seven games with two clean sheets. Later in 2021, he joined York United FC of the Canadian Premier League on an emergency basis, to serve as a substitute after an injury to starting goalkeeper Nathan Ingham.

In 2022, after spending the preseason with York United, Himaras signed with Electric City FC of League1 Ontario. He made his debut on May 21 in a 2–1 victory over ProStars FC.

In July 2022, Himaras re-joined York United on a permanent basis. He made his debut on August 7 against Valour FC, coming on as a first-half substitute for Niko Giantsopoulos, after the latter suffered an injury. He made his first start in the next match on August 14, in a 3–2 victory over FC Edmonton. In December 2022, he re-signed for another year, with an option for 2024. In January 2024, he re-signed with the club for the 2024 season.

In January 2025, Himaras signed a one-year contract, with an option for 2026 with Valour FC. After the club folded following the 2025 season, he became a free agent.

In January 2026, Himaras signed a one-year contract with Pacific FC, with options for 2027 and 2028.

== International career ==
In March 2019, he was called up to the Canada U17 team for a training camp. He was later named to the Canadian roster for the 2019 FIFA U-17 World Cup, where he made his debut against New Zealand.

== Career statistics ==
As of October 27, 2025

Appearances and goals by club, season and competition
Club	Season	League			Playoffs		National cup		Other		Total	
Club	Season	Division	Apps	Goals	Apps	Goals	Apps	Goals	Apps	Goals	Apps	Goals
Toronto FC III	2018	League1 Ontario	1	0	—		—		—		1	0
Toronto FC II	2019	USL League One	0	0	—		—		—		0	0
FC London	2021	League1 Ontario	10	0	—		—		—		10	0
York United (loan)	2021	Canadian Premier League	0	0	0	0	0	0	—		0	0
Electric City FC	2022	League1 Ontario	3	0	—		—		—		3	0
York United	2022	Canadian Premier League	10	0	—		0	0	—		10	0
York United	2023	Canadian Premier League	2	0	0	0	0	0	—		2	0
York United	2024	Canadian Premier League	0	0	0	0	0	0	—		0	0
York United	Total		12	0	0	0	0	0	0	0	12	0
Valour FC	2025	Canadian Premier League	9	0	—		3	0	—		12	0
Career total			35	0	0	0	3	0	0	0	38	0
