= Mamadou Kane (soccer, born 2003) =

Canadian soccer player

Personal information
- Full name: Mouhamadou Kane
- Date of birth: October 12, 2003 (age 23)
- Place of birth: Mbacké, Senegal
- Height: 6 ft 0 in (1.83 m)
- Position: Forward

Team information
- Current team: AS Laval

Youth career
- FS Salaberry
- CF Montreal

Senior career*
Years	Team	Apps	(Gls)
2022	York United	11	(0)
2022	→ FC Edmonton (loan)	7	(0)
2023	Vancouver FC	8	(0)
2024	CS St-Laurent	14	(8)
2025–	AS Laval	17	(12)

International career^{‡}
2019	Canada U17	3	(0)
- * Club domestic league appearances and goals as of September 23, 2025 ‡ National team caps and goals as of November 2, 2019

Mouhamadou "Mamadou" Kane (born October 12, 2003) is a soccer player who plays for AS Laval in Ligue1 Québec. Born in Senegal, he has represented Canada at youth level.

== Early life ==
Kane was born in Mbacké, Senegal and moved to Montréal, Canada at age nine. He began playing youth soccer in Canada at age nine with FS Salaberry. He later joined the CF Montreal Academy.

== Club career ==
In December 2021, he signed a two-year contract with an option for a third season with York United of the Canadian Premier League. He made his debut on April 7, 2022, against the HFX Wanderers. In July 2022, he was sent on an intra-league loan to FC Edmonton.

In December 2022, Kane moved to fellow CPL side Vancouver FC for the 2023 season. Ahead of the 2024 season, he terminated his contract with the club by mutual consent.

In 2024, he played with CS St-Laurent in Ligue1 Québec. On April 27, he scored a hat trick in a 7–2 victory over CS St-Hubert. On May 2, 2024, he scored the winning penalty kick in the shootout (as well as scoring during the match) in the 2024 Canadian Championship first round match against Canadian Premier League side HFX Wanderers FC to help St-Laurent advance to the next round and become the first Ligue1 Québec side to defeat a professional club.

In 2025, Kane moved to fellow Ligue1 Québec side AS Laval for the 2025 season. He won the Golden Boot as the league's top goalscorer in 2025.

== International career ==
In 2019, he was named to the Canada U17 team for the 2019 FIFA U-17 World Cup. He made his debut October 26, starting the match against Brazil U17, and appeared in their other two matches as a substitute. In May 2022, he was named to the 60-man provisional roster for the Canada U20 team for the 2022 CONCACAF U-20 Championship.

== Personal life ==
He is the older brother of fellow professional soccer player Khadim Kane.

== Career statistics ==
As of September 29, 2025

Club	Season	League			Playoffs		Domestic Cup		League Cup		Total	
Club	Season	Division	Apps	Goals	Apps	Goals	Apps	Goals	Apps	Goals	Apps	Goals
York United FC	2022	Canadian Premier League	11	0	–		2	0	–		13	0
FC Edmonton (loan)	2022	Canadian Premier League	7	0	–		0	0	–		7	0
Vancouver FC	2023	Canadian Premier League	8	0	–		0	0	–		8	0
CS Saint-Laurent	2024	Ligue1 Québec	14	8	–		3	1	3	3	20	12
AS Laval	2025	Ligue1 Québec	17	12	–		–		2	0	19	12
Career total			57	20	0	0	3	1	5	3	65	24
