= Daniel Obbekjær =

Danish footballer (born 2002)

Personal information
- Date of birth: 16 July 2002 (age 24)
- Place of birth: Odense, Denmark
- Height: 1.94 m (6 ft 4 in)
- Position: Centre-back

Team information
- Current team: NSÍ
- Number: 4

Youth career
- 2006–2016: Næsby
- 2016–2021: OB
- 2021: → SPAL (loan)

Senior career*
Years	Team	Apps	(Gls)
2019–2021	OB	7	(0)
2022	York United	1	(0)
2022–2023	07 Vestur	42	(6)
2024	VPS	0	(0)
2024–2025	Breiðablik	13	(3)
2025–	NSÍ	40	(9)

International career
2018	Denmark U16	1	(0)
2018–2019	Denmark U17	13	(1)
2019	Denmark U18	2	(0)
2019–2020	Denmark U19	4	(0)
- * Club domestic league appearances and goals as of 17:37, 1 November 2026 (UTC)

Daniel Obbekjær (born 16 July 2002) is a Danish professional footballer who plays as a centre-back for Faroe Islands Premier League club NSÍ.

== Early life ==
Obbekjær started playing football at the age of 4 in Næsby Boldklub, before joining Odense Boldklub 10 years later.

== Club career ==
=== OB ===
In January 2019, Obbekjær went on training camp in Turkey with the OB first team. On 1 April 2019 it was confirmed, that 16-year old Obbekjær had signed his first professional contract until the summer 2021 and was promoted permanently to the first team squad. At the end of the month, Obbekjær got his professional debut for OB against F.C. Copenhagen. Obbekjær started on the bench but replaced Mathias Greve in the 64th minute which made him the third youngest debutant in the club's history. In October 2019, Obbekjær became the youngest Danish Superliga starter in OB's history at the age of 17 years and 94 days.

In January 2020, 17-year old Obbekjær went on a trial at Premier League klub Brighton & Hove Albion after being scouted by the club.

On 22 January 2021, Obbekjær joined Italian Serie B side S.P.A.L. on loan for the rest of the season, with an option to buy. He was registered for the clubs Primavera (U19) team.

After returning to OB, Obbekjær didn't feature on OB's first team list. In July 2021, he went on a trial at Hobro IK, however, he returned without being offered a contract. With Obbekjær's contract with OB expiring at the end of 2021, he was sent to the U19, as he was not registered for the first team.

=== York United ===
On 5 January 2022, Obbekjær signed a two-year contract with Canadian Premier League side York United, with options until 2025.

=== 07 Vestur ===
In June 2022, he joined 07 Vestur in the Faroe Islands. After a good time in Vestur, where he became the club's captain while also making the team of the year in the 2023 season, Obbekjær left the club when his contract expired at the end of October 2023.

=== Breiðablik ===
After a short trial period with Finnish club VPS, including one played Finnish League Cup match, in March 2024, Obbekjaer joined Icelandic Besta deild karla club Breiðablik on a contract until 2025.

== Career statistics ==
As of 23 October 2024

Appearances and goals by club, season and competition
Club	Season	League			National cup (Note: Includes Danish Cup, Faroe Islands Cup and Icelandic Cup)		League cup (Note: Includes Finnish League Cup)		Europe		Total	
Club	Season	Division	Apps	Goals	Apps	Goals	Apps	Goals	Apps	Goals	Apps	Goals
OB	2018–19	Danish Superliga	1	0	0	0	—		—		1	0
OB	2019–20	Danish Superliga	6	0	0	0	—		—		7	0
OB	2020–21	Danish Superliga	0	0	0	0	—		—		0	0
OB	Total		7	0	0	0	—		—		7	0
York United	2022	Canadian Premier League	1	0	0	0	—		—		1	0
07 Vestur	2022	Faroe Islands Premier League	15	2	2	0	—		—		17	2
07 Vestur	2023	Faroe Islands Premier League	27	4	4	1	—		—		31	5
07 Vestur	Total		42	6	6	1	—		—		48	7
VPS	2024	Veikkausliiga	0	0	0	0	1	0	0	0	1	0
Breiðablik	2024	Besta deild karla	8	3	1	0	0	0	0	0	9	3
Career total			58	9	7	1	1	0	0	0	66	10

== Honours ==
NSÍ

- Faroe Islands Premier League: 2026
