= Niko Giantsopoulos =

Canadian soccer player

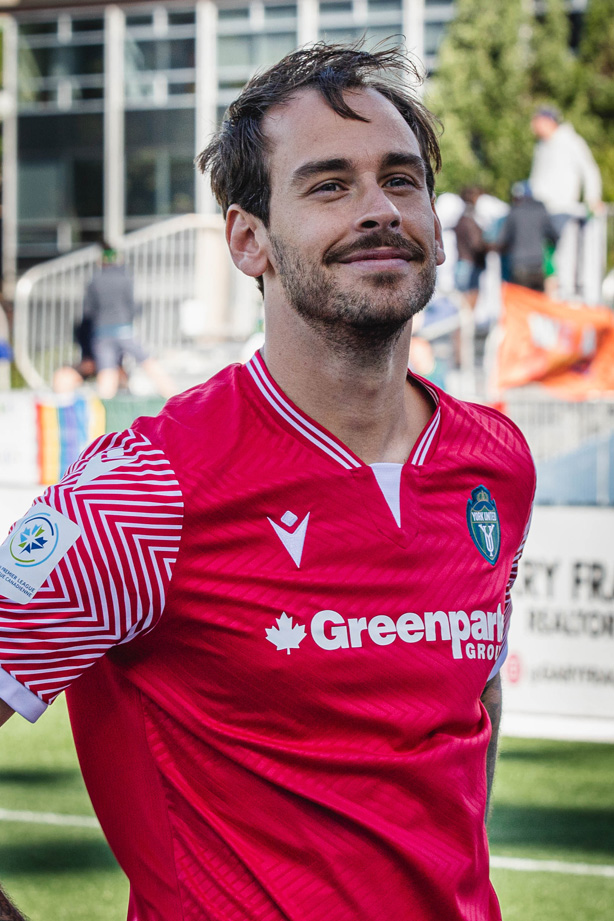
- Giantsopoulos with York United in 2022

Personal information
- Full name: Nikolaos Giantsopoulos
- Date of birth: June 24, 1994 (age 32)
- Place of birth: Markham, Ontario, Canada
- Height: 1.82 m (6 ft 0 in)
- Position: Goalkeeper

Youth career
- Unionville Milliken SC
- Pickering SC
- Ajax SC

College career
| Years | Team | Apps | (Gls) |
| 2012–2013 | Adrian Bulldogs | 35 | (0) |
| 2014–2015 | Calvin Knights | 47 | (0) |

Senior career*
| Years | Team | Apps | (Gls) |
| 2014 | Durham United FC | 0 | (0) |
| 2015 | Ocala Stampede | 7 | (0) |
| 2016 | Devonport City | 21 | (0) |
| 2017 | Broadmeadow Magic | 19 | (0) |
| 2018 | Launceston City | 21 | (0) |
| 2019–2020 | Cavalry FC | 6 | (0) |
| 2021–2023 | York United | 49 | (0) |
| 2022 | → Vancouver Whitecaps FC (loan) | 0 | (0) |
| 2024 | Vancouver FC | 0 | (0) |
| Total | | 123 | (0) |

Managerial career
- 2025–: Vancouver FC (goalkeepers)
- * Club domestic league appearances and goals as of April 5, 2024

Nikolaos Giantsopoulos (born June 24, 1994) is a Canadian former professional soccer player who currently serves as goalkeeper coach with Vancouver FC in the Canadian Premier League.

== Early life ==
Giantsopoulos played youth soccer with Unionville Milliken SC, Pickering SC, and Ajax SC. With Ajax, he won the national U18 championship in 2011.

== College career ==
=== Adrian College ===
In 2012, he began his college career with NCAA Division III school Adrian College in Michigan. He won All-MIAA first team accolades and NSCAA Division III All-Central region honors in 2013. He played there for two seasons, but decided to transfer schools after the soccer coaching staff was relieved of their duties.

=== Calvin College ===
Despite interest from NCAA Division I and Division II schools, he decided to transfer to Division III Calvin College. In his two seasons at Calvin, he was named to the All-MIAA first team and the NSCAA Division III All-Central Region first team twice as well as the NSCAA Division III All-America third team. He help lead them to the MIAA championship and advanced to the second round of the NCAA Division III Tournament. During his two years as Calvin's starting goalkeeper, he posted a win-loss record of 40-3-4, including a 28-0 record in MIAA competition.

== Club career ==
=== Durham United ===
He served as an unused substitute keeper for Durham United FC for a match in League1 Ontario in 2014, but did not play.

=== Ocala Stampede ===
In 2015, he played for the Ocala Stampede in the Premier Development League.

=== Devonport City ===
In March 2016, Giantsopoulos joined Devonport City in the NPL Tasmania, the second tier of soccer in Australia. He started all 21 matches for Devonport in the 2016 season, helping to lead the team to a league championship and was named to the NPL Tasmania Team of the Year. In the 90th minute of the Round of 16 match in the FFA Cup against Bentleigh Greens with the score at 0-0, he suffered a shoulder injury and was forced to leave the game, which Devonport ultimately lost 1-0, after extra time. As a result of the injury, he also missed the Semi-Finals and Finals of the NPL Tasmania Playoff Series, where Devonport ultimately lost in the Finals, as well as the NPL Finals Series for the champions of each of the regional leagues. He won the inaugural "Players' Player" Award.

=== Broadmeadow Magic ===
In 2017, he joined Broadmeadow Magic in the NPL Northern NSW, a different regional league in the same second tier of Australian soccer.

=== Launceston City ===
Giantsopoulos returned to the Tasmania regional division, signing with NPL Tasmania club Launceston City for the 2018 season. He was named vice-captain of the club, and started all 21 matches in 2018. On August 18, in a match against South Hobart, as a penalty shot was about to be taken, Giantsopoulos ran up and kicked the ball away before it could be taken. He was yellow carded, but his antics proved to be effective, as the ensuing penalty shot was missed. The incident became a viral video around the world. This was part of a streak of three consecutive penalty saves in three matches for Giantsopoulos. He was named to the NPL Tasmania Team of the Year at the end of the season.

=== Cavalry FC ===
Giantsopoulos returned to Canada and signed with Cavalry FC of the Canadian Premier League on January 23, 2019. He served as the backup goalkeeper behind Marco Carducci. He made his debut on May 16 in a Canadian Championship match against Pacific FC. After the season, he re-signed with the club for an additional year. After two years with Cavalry, Giantsopoulos left after the 2020 season in an attempt to gain more playing time. In his limited playing time for Cavalry, Giantsopoulos earned four clean sheets and had the best save percentage of any CPL goalkeeper.

=== York United FC ===
On November 10, 2020, Giantsopoulos signed a two-year contract with his hometown club, York United. He made his debut for York United on July 7, 2021 in a 2-1 victory over Valour FC.

On May 20, 2022, immediately after earning a clean sheet against Pacific FC, Giantsopoulos joined Major League Soccer club Vancouver Whitecaps FC on loan for their match on May 22, as the Whitecaps were left without any of their three goalkeepers due to injury and COVID protocols. He did not feature in the match, serving as an unused substitute. His loan expired on May 23, allowing him to return to play for York in their Canadian Championship match on May 24, where he made the game-winning save in the penalty shootout to advance to the semi-finals, where coincidentally, York was matched against Vancouver. In December 2022, he re-signed with York United on a one-year extension for the 2023 season. He began serving as team captain during the 2023 season. After the 2023 season, he turned down a contract extension offer from York, and he began training with his former club Cavalry, but did not ultimately sign. He later joined Vancouver FC during their 2024 pre-season.

=== Vancouver FC ===
In April 2024, Giantsopoulos signed with Vancouver FC for the 2024 season, with an option for 2025. Despite not making any appearances in the 2024 season serving as the backup keeper, Giantsopolous signed an extension for the 2025 season, after the 2024 season.

In March 2025, he announced his retirement.

== Coaching career ==
In 2025, Giantsopoulos was named goalkeepers coach with Vancouver FC.

== Media career ==
In 2021, along with his club team York United FC, Giantsopolous launched a podcast series called ‘The Last Line: A Goalkeeper’s Podcast’. In March 2022, he became the co-host of a radio talk show focussed on soccer called 'Footy First' on TSN Radio 1050.

== Personal life ==
Born in Canada, Giantsopoulos is of Greek descent.

== Career statistics ==
As of October 19, 2024

| Club | Season | League | | | Playoffs (Note: Includes other competitive competitions such as NPL Playoff Finals and CPL Playoffs.) | | Domestic Cup (Note: Includes FFA Cup, Milan Lakoseljac Cup and Canadian Championship) | | Continental | | Total | |
| Club | Season | League | Apps | Goals | Apps | Goals | Apps | Goals | Apps | Goals | Apps | Goals |
|---|---|---|---|---|---|---|---|---|---|---|---|---|
| Durham United FC | 2014 | League1 Ontario | 0 | 0 | — | | — | | — | | 0 | 0 |
| Ocala Stampede | 2015 | Premier Development League | 7 | 0 | ? | 0 | 0 | 0 | — | | 7 | 0 |
| Devonport City | 2016 | NPL Tasmania | 21 | 0 | 1 | 0 | 5 | 0 | — | | 27 | 0 |
| Broadmeadow Magic | 2017 | NPL Northern NSW | 19 | 0 | 1 | 0 | 5 | 0 | — | | 25 | 0 |
| Launceston City | 2018 | NPL Tasmania | 21 | 0 | — | | 3 | 0 | — | | 24 | 0 |
| Cavalry FC | 2019 | Canadian Premier League | 5 | 0 | 0 | 0 | 4 | 0 | — | | 9 | 0 |
| Cavalry FC | 2020 | Canadian Premier League | 1 | 0 | — | | — | | — | | 1 | 0 |
| Cavalry FC | Total | | 6 | 0 | 0 | 0 | 4 | 0 | 0 | 0 | 10 | 0 |
| York United | 2021 | Canadian Premier League | 9 | 0 | 0 | 0 | 0 | 0 | — | | 9 | 0 |
| York United | 2022 | Canadian Premier League | 18 | 0 | — | | 3 | 0 | — | | 21 | 0 |
| York United | 2023 | Canadian Premier League | 22 | 0 | 1 | 0 | 2 | 0 | — | | 25 | 0 |
| York United | Total | | 49 | 0 | 1 | 0 | 5 | 0 | 0 | 0 | 55 | 0 |
| Vancouver Whitecaps FC (loan) | 2022 | Major League Soccer | 0 | 0 | — | | 0 | 0 | — | | 0 | 0 |
| Vancouver FC | 2024 | Canadian Premier League | 0 | 0 | — | | 0 | 0 | — | | 0 | 0 |
| Career totals | | | 123 | 0 | 3 | 0 | 22 | 0 | – | – | 148 | 0 |

== Honours ==
=== Club ===
Devonport City

- NPL Tasmania Champions: 2016
- NPL Tasmania Playoff Runner-Up: 2016
- Milan Lakoseljac Cup Champions: 2016

Cavalry FC

- Canadian Premier League (Regular season):
  - Champions: Spring 2019, Fall 2019
- Canadian Premier League Finals
  - Runners-up: 2019

=== Individual ===
- NPL Tasmania Team of the Year: 2016, 2018
