= Luis Lawrie-Lattanzio =

Australian association football player

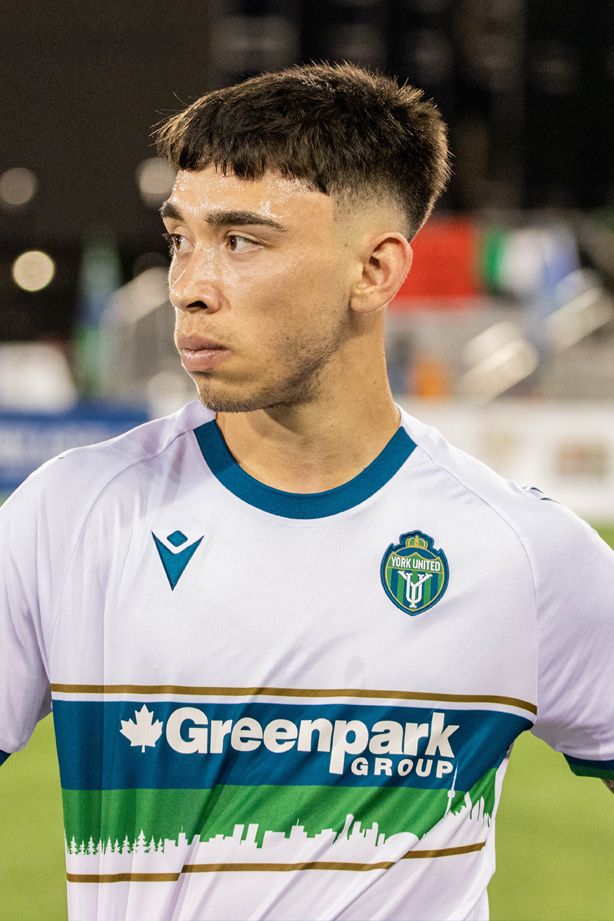
- Lawrie-Lattanzio with York United in 2022

Personal information
- Full name: Luis Marcus Nicola Lawrie-Lattanzio
- Date of birth: 20 February 2002 (age 24)
- Place of birth: Adelaide, Australia
- Height: 1.72 m (5 ft 7 1/2 in)
- Positions: Winger; forward

Team information
- Current team: Adelaide City
- Number: 25

Youth career
- Metrostars
- FSA NTC
- Adelaide United
- 2019–2021: Melbourne Victory

Senior career*
Years	Team	Apps	(Gls)
2018–2019	Adelaide United NPL	12	(0)
2020–2022	Melbourne Victory	18	(0)
2022	Campbelltown City	2	(0)
2022	York United	12	(2)
2023	Campbelltown City	24	(7)
2024–	Adelaide City	48	(18)

International career^{‡}
2019	Australia U17	2	(0)
- * Club domestic league appearances and goals as of 9 September 2024 ‡ National team caps and goals as of 25 May 2022

Luis Marcus Nicola Lawrie-Lattanzio (born 20 February 2002) is an Australian soccer player who plays for Adelaide City in NPL South Australia. As of January 2023, he remains the only active Indigenous male professional soccer player from South Australia.

== Early life ==
Lawrie-Lattanzio was born in Adelaide, Australia to an Indigenous Australian mother and Italian father. His mother was born in Kimba, South Australia but was raised in Eucla, Western Australia (492 km away) where his maternal family were originally from. His paternal grandparents hailed from the Italian provinces of Basilicata and Abruzzo. Lawrie-Lattanzio mainly grew up in the city of Adelaide, where he attended Blackfriars Priory School in Prospect. He piqued interest in numerous sports, regularly participating in Australian rules football, athletics and soccer. He holds an Italian passport through his father.

Lawrie-Lattanzio played youth soccer with Metrostars, before joining the Football South Australia National Training Centre program. Afterwards, he joined the youth system of Adelaide United, before later joining Melbourne Victory FC. He had a prominent season in the 2019–20 Y-League helping the Victory reach the Grand Final and being awarded with the Melbourne Victory FC Y-League Victory Medal & TAC Y-League Golden Boot.

== Club career ==
In October 2019, Lawrie-Lattanzio joined A-League Men side Melbourne Victory. He made his professional debut on 25 July 2020 against Western United and later made his AFC Champions League debut against Beijing Guoan on 27 November. He scored his first professional goal on 6 February 2021 against the Brisbane Roar. In May 2022, he departed the club, upon the expiry of his contract.

In June 2022, he signed with Campbelltown City in the second-tier NPL South Australia.

On 6 July 2022, he signed with Canadian Premier League club York United. He made his debut on 15 July against Pacific FC, coming on as a substitute. He scored his first goal on 1 August against the HFX Wanderers. In December 2022, York announced that would not be exercising Lawrie-Lattanzio's contract option for 2023.

In 2023, he returned to Campbelltown City in the second-tier NPL South Australia. On 10 March 2023, he scored two goals in a 3–0 victory over FK Beograd.

In 2024, he joined Adelaide City in the NPL South Australia.

== International career ==
Lawrie-Lattanzio began his international career with the Joeys in 2019, where he was announced in the squad for the 2019 FIFA U-17 World Cup. Lawrie-Lattanzio featured in the first match against Ecuador U17.

== Honours ==
Melbourne Victory

- FFA Cup: 2021
