= Jordan Wilson =

Canadian soccer player (born 1991)

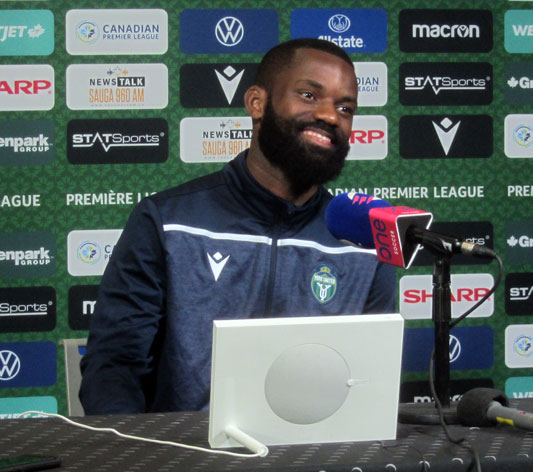
- Wilson with York United in 2021

Personal information
- Full name: Jordan Andrew Wilson
- Date of birth: October 31, 1991 (age 35)
- Place of birth: Mississauga, Ontario, Canada
- Height: 1.79 m (5 ft 10 1/2 in)
- Position: Midfielder

Youth career
- Erin Mills SC

College career
Years	Team	Apps	(Gls)
2009–2013	Cornerstone Golden Eagles	63	(5)

Senior career*
Years	Team	Apps	(Gls)
2014	Croydon FC		
2015	Rishøj		
2015–2020	Nykøbing	138	(2)
2021–2022	York United	52	(5)
2023–2024	Scrosoppi FC	4	(0)
2024	→ Scrosoppi FC B	1	(0)

International career^{‡}
2018	Cascadia	6	(0)
- * Club domestic league appearances and goals as of July 24, 2024 ‡ National team caps and goals as of June 27, 2021

Jordan Andrew Wilson (born October 31, 1991) is a Canadian soccer player. He also currently works as a sports television pundit for OneSoccer.

== Early life ==
Wilson was born in Mississauga, Ontario in 1991. He played youth soccer with Erin Mills SC, winning the U18 OYSL title in 2009.

== College career ==
In 2009, Wilson began Cornerstone University, where he played for the men's soccer team. On September 30, 2009, he scored his first collegiate goal against the Marygrove Mustangs. At the end of his first season, he was named to the All-WHAC First Team, and was also named the team MCP, MVP Defensive Player, and Goal of the Year by his team. In 2010 and 2011, he was again named to the All-WHAC First Team. In 2013, he was named to the All-WHAC First Team for the fourth time and was also named the WHAC Defensive Player of the Year.

During his college offseasons, he trained with Chicago Bridges FC.

== Club career ==
After departing college, Wilson played with Croydon FC in England. He then had a trial with League Two club Southend United.

In July 2014, he went on trial with Danish Superliga side SønderjyskE. However, they chose not to sign him following his trial period. In January 2015, he went on trial with Akademisk Boldklub. He later trialed with Brønshøj.

In February 2015, he signed with Danish 2nd Division side Rishøj.

In July 2015, Wilson signed with fellow 2nd Division side Nykøbing. While with the club, they got promoted to the second tier Danish 1st Division. In November 2018, he extended his contract until the summer of 2020. He departed the club in July 2020, upon the expiry of his contract. Over his five seasons, he made just under 150 appearances for the club.

In October 2020, Wilson returned to Canada, signing a one-year contract for the 2021 season with Canadian Premier League side York United with options until 2023. On July 1, 2021, he scored his first goal for the club in a match against Pacific FC. On October 9, he scored a goal in injury time to secure a 1-1 draw against Atlético Ottawa. On August 14, 2023, he scored the winning goal in a 3-2 victory over FC Edmonton.

In January 2023, Wilson announced his retirement from professional soccer. However, he continued to play at the semi-professional level with Scrosoppi FC in League1 Ontario.

== International career ==
In 2018, Wilson represented the Cascadia official soccer team at the 2018 CONIFA World Football Cup.

== Media career ==
Since the start of the 2021 Canadian Premier League season, Wilson has collaborated with Canadian sports streaming service OneSoccer, serving as a guest on the show’s studio panel and providing on-site coverage. In January 2023, he officially joined the platform as a full-time match analyst.

== Personal life ==
While he played with York United, Wilson would act as a barber, regularly cutting his teammates hair. In March 2021, he joined youth club International SC, in his hometown of Mississauga as a soccer coach.

== Career statistics ==
As of September 8, 2024

Club statistics
Club	Season	League			Playoffs		National Cup		Other		Total	
Club	Season	Division	Apps	Goals	Apps	Goals	Apps	Goals	Apps	Goals	Apps	Goals
Nykøbing	2015–16	Danish 2nd Division	26	0	—		1	0	—		27	0
Nykøbing	2016–17	Danish 1st Division	29	1	—		2	1	—		31	2
Nykøbing	2017–18	Danish 1st Division	31	0	—		2	0	—		33	0
Nykøbing	2018–19	Danish 1st Division	26	1	—		3	0	—		29	1
Nykøbing	2019–20	Danish 1st Division	26	0	—		3	0	—		29	0
Nykøbing	Total		138	2	0	0	10	1	0	0	148	3
York United	2021	Canadian Premier League	25	2	1	0	2	1	—		28	3
York United	2022	Canadian Premier League	26	3	—		3	0	—		29	3
York United	Total		51	5	1	0	5	1	0	0	57	6
Scrosoppi FC	2023	League1 Ontario	2	0	0	0	—		—		2	0
Scrosoppi FC	2024	League1 Ontario Premier	2	0	0	0	—		0	0	2	0
Scrosoppi FC	Total		4	0	0	0	0	0	0	0	4	0
Scrosoppi FC B	2024	League2 Ontario	1	0	1	0	—		—		2	0
Career total			194	7	2	0	15	2	0	0	211	9
