= Roger Thompson (soccer) =

Canadian soccer player (born 1991)

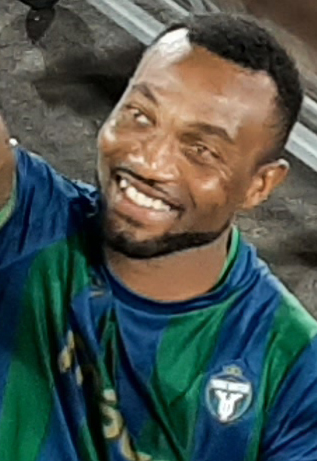
- Thompson in 2021

Personal information
- Full name: Roger Thompson
- Date of birth: 19 December 1991 (age 34)
- Place of birth: Clarendon, Jamaica
- Height: 1.91 m (6 ft 3 in)
- Position: Centre-back

Youth career
- Brampton East SC
- Vaughan SC

College career
| Years | Team | Apps | (Gls) |
| 2009 | Graceland Yellowjackets | 14 | (3) |
| 2010–2011 | Cincinnati Bearcats | 22 | (0) |

Senior career*
| Years | Team | Apps | (Gls) |
| 2012 | Vasa IFK | 21 | (0) |
| 2013–2014 | IFK Mariehamn | 50 | (0) |
| 2014–2015 | KSV Baunatal | 12 | (0) |
| 2015–2016 | Trelleborgs FF | 26 | (0) |
| 2017–2018 | Ljungskile SK | 38 | (0) |
| 2019–2023 | York United | 55 | (1) |

International career^{‡}
| 2010–2011 | Canada U20 | 3 | (0) |
- * Club domestic league appearances and goals as of September 23, 2023 ‡ National team caps and goals as of 18 January 2019

Roger Thompson (born 19 December 1991) is a former professional soccer player who played as a centre-back. Born in Jamaica, he represented Canada at youth international level.

== Club career ==
=== Early career ===
After moving to Canada, Thompson started playing soccer with Brampton East SC. He later played with Vaughan SC.

In 2009, he played 14 matches for the Graceland University, scoring three goals.

In 2010 he attended the University of Cincinnati and made 19 appearances for the Cincinnati Bearcats. In 2011 Thompson was able to play just three matches due to injury.

=== Vasa IFK ===
In early 2012 Thompson trained two weeks with Veikkausliiga club VPS Vaasa, but he wasn't signed. In April 2012 he signed a year-long contract with another Vaasa based club Vasa IFK. He played 21 matches for the team at the Finnish third tier Kakkonen.

=== IFK Mariehamn ===
In January 2013, Thompson was signed for two years by IFK Mariehamn.

=== KSV Baunatal ===
In November 2014, Thompson signed with German Regionalliga side KSV Baunatal.

=== Trelleborgs FF ===
In August 2015, Thompson signed with Swedish Division 1 club Trelleborgs FF and helped them earn promotion to the Superettan.

=== Ljungskile SK ===
In March 2017, Thompson signed with Swedish Division 1 club Ljungskile SK.

=== York United FC ===
Thompson signed with Canadian Premier League club York9 FC on 7 January 2019, which later became known as York United FC beginning in the 2021 season. He retired from the sport in December 2023.

== International career ==
Thompson is eligible to represent Canada by naturalization and Jamaica by birth.

Thompson earned his first call-up to the Canada U-20 team for the 2010 COTIF Tournament. He participated in two more Canada U-20 camps before being named to Canada's squad for the 2011 CONCACAF U-20 Championship, where he made three appearances.

== Career statistics ==
As of match played July 9, 2023

| Club | Division | Season | League | | Domestic Cup | | League Cup | | Other | | Total | |
| Club | Division | Season | Apps | Goals | Apps | Goals | Apps | Goals | Apps | Goals | Apps | Goals |
|---|---|---|---|---|---|---|---|---|---|---|---|---|
| Vasa IFK | Kakkonen | 2012 | 21 | 0 | 0 | 0 | — | | — | | 21 | 0 |
| IFK Mariehamn | Veikkausliiga | 2013 | 30 | 0 | 3 | 0 | 6 | 1 | 2 (Note: Appearance(s) in the UEFA Europa League) | 0 | 41 | 1 |
| IFK Mariehamn | Veikkausliiga | 2014 | 20 | 0 | 2 | 0 | 4 | 0 | 0 | 0 | 26 | 0 |
| IFK Mariehamn | Total | | 50 | 0 | 5 | 0 | 10 | 1 | 2 | 0 | 67 | 1 |
| KSV Baunatal | Regionalliga Südwest | 2014-2015 | 12 | 0 | 0 | 0 | — | | — | | 12 | 0 |
| Trelleborgs FF | Södra | 2015 | 9 | 0 | 0 | 0 | — | | — | | 9 | 0 |
| Trelleborgs FF | Superettan | 2016 | 17 | 0 | 1 | 0 | — | | — | | 18 | 0 |
| Trelleborgs FF | Total | | 26 | 0 | 1 | 0 | 0 | 0 | 0 | 0 | 27 | 0 |
| Ljungskile SK | Södra | 2017 | 25 | 0 | 0 | 0 | — | | — | | 25 | 0 |
| Ljungskile SK | Södra | 2018 | 13 | 0 | 0 | 0 | — | | — | | 25 | 0 |
| Ljungskile SK | Total | | 38 | 0 | 0 | 0 | 0 | 0 | 0 | 0 | 38 | 0 |
| York United | Canadian Premier League | 2019 | 10 | 0 | 2 | 0 | — | | — | | 12 | 0 |
| York United | Canadian Premier League | 2020 | 7 | 0 | — | | — | | — | | 7 | 0 |
| York United | Canadian Premier League | 2021 | 9 | 0 | 1 | 0 | — | | 0 (Note: Appearance(s) in the Canadian Premier League playoffs) | 0 | 10 | 0 |
| York United | Canadian Premier League | 2022 | 14 | 0 | 1 | 1 | — | | — | | 15 | 1 |
| York United | Canadian Premier League | 2023 | 15 | 1 | 1 | 0 | — | | 0 | 0 | 16 | 1 |
| York United | Total | | 55 | 1 | 5 | 1 | 0 | 0 | 0 | 0 | 60 | 2 |
| Career total | | | 202 | 1 | 11 | 1 | 10 | 1 | 2 | 0 | 124 | 3 |

== Personal life ==
Thompson was born in Clarendon Parish, Jamaica to Jamaican parents and moved to Brampton, Ontario at the age of ten.
