= William Wallace (Brazilian footballer) =

Brazilian footballer (born 2002)

Personal information
- Full name: William Wallace Monteiro de Lima
- Date of birth: 4 July 2002 (age 24)
- Place of birth: Fortaleza, Brazil
- Height: 1.81 m (5 ft 11 in)
- Positions: Left winger; left-back

Youth career
- 2016–2019: Floresta
- 2019–2020: Fluminense

Senior career*
Years	Team	Apps	(Gls)
2021–2022	York United	2	(0)
2021–2022	→ Floresta (loan)		
- * Club domestic league appearances and goals as of 23 December 2022

William Wallace Monteiro de Lima (born 4 July 2002) is a Brazilian professional footballer.

== Early life ==
Wallace played at the youth level in Brazil with Floresta. In 2019, he joined Fluminense.

== Club career ==
In November 2020, Wallace signed a two-year contract with Canadian Premier League side York United, with an option for 2023, to join the club in 2021. Fluminense retained part of Wallace's economic rights as part of the transfer. In late August 2021, after being unable to join York due to being unable to acquire a visa due to the COVID-19 pandemic, he was loaned to his former youth club Floresta until 1 March 2022. Wallace also agreed to a restructuring of his contract, adding an additional option for 2024. On 7 May 2022, Wallace made his debut as a substitute for York United in a 1–0 win over Forge FC. In June 2022, it was announced that Wallace ruptured his ACL in training and would miss the remainder of the season. In December 2022, York announced Wallace's contract option for the 2023 would not be exercised.
