= Sebastián Gutiérrez (footballer) =

Colombian footballer (born 1997)

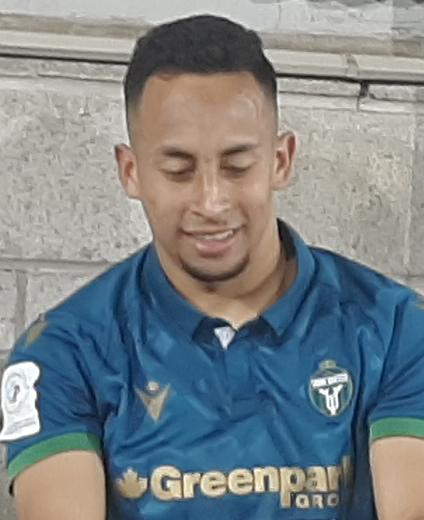
- Gutiérrez in 2022

Personal information
- Full name: Sebastián Gutiérrez Atehortua
- Date of birth: 29 September 1997 (age 29)
- Place of birth: Medellín, Colombia
- Height: 1.63 m (5 ft 4 in)
- Position: Attacking midfielder

Team information
- Current team: Churchill Brothers
- Number: 10

Senior career*
Years	Team	Apps	(Gls)
2016–2017	Patriotas	6	(0)
2018–2019	Llaneros	47	(10)
2021–2022	York United	29	(3)
2023	Valledupar	14	(4)
2023–2024	Real Cundinamarca	8	(0)
2024–2025	Churchill Brothers	17	(4)
2025–2026	Orsomarso	8	(0)
2026	Dempo	12	(2)
2026–	Churchill Brothers	4	(3)
- * Club domestic league appearances and goals as of 5 November 2026 (UTC)

Sebastián Gutiérrez Atehortua (born 29 September 1997) is a Colombian professional footballer who plays as a midfielder for Indian Super League club Churchill Brothers.

== Club career ==
=== Patriotas ===
On 2 September 2016, Gutiérrez made his senior debut for Categoría Primera A side Patriotas in the Copa Colombia, which would be his only appearance of the season. The following season, he made six league appearances for Patriotas and two appearances in the Copa Colombia.

=== Llaneros ===
In 2018, Gutiérrez joined Categoría Primera B side Llaneros, making eight league appearances and six in the league finals, where he scored two goals in a 5–0 win over Cortuluá. The following season, he scored eight goals in 27 appearances in league play, and made another six appearances in the Torneo I finals.

=== York United ===
On 15 December 2020, Gutiérrez signed with Canadian Premier League side York United. Following a visa issue preventing him from entering the country, he finally joined the team in August 2021. On 21 August he made his debut for York against Master's FA in a Canadian Championship match. In December 2021 York United announced they had triggered the contract option on Gutiérrez, keeping him at the club through 2022. After the 2022 season, York declined his contract option.

== Career statistics ==
As of 10 December 2021

Club statistics
Club	Season	League			National Cup (Note: Includes appearances in the Copa Colombia.)		Continental		Other (Note: Includes appearances in the Categoría Primera B finals.)		Total	
Club	Season	Division	Apps	Goals	Apps	Goals	Apps	Goals	Apps	Goals	Apps	Goals
Patriotas	2016	Categoría Primera A	0	0	1	0	—		0	0	1	0
Patriotas	2017	Categoría Primera A	6	0	2	0	0	0	0	0	8	0
Patriotas	Total		6	0	3	0	0	0	0	0	9	0
Llaneros	2018	Categoría Primera B	8	0	1	0	—		6	2	15	2
Llaneros	2019	Categoría Primera B	27	8	1	0	—		6	0	34	8
Llaneros	Total		35	8	2	0	0	0	12	2	49	10
York United	2021	Canadian Premier League	13	1	2	0	—		0	0	15	1
Career total			54	9	7	0	0	0	12	2	73	11
