= Dominick Zator =

Canadian soccer player (born 1994)

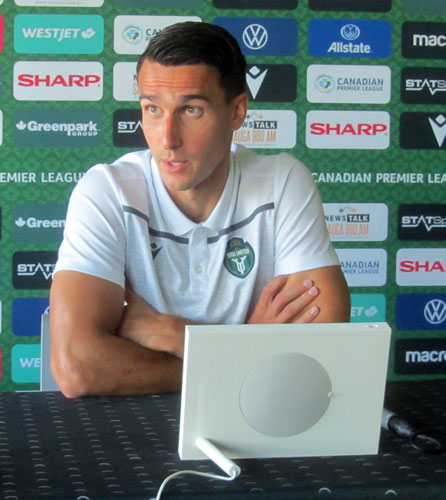
- Zator in 2021

Personal information
- Full name: Dominick Lukasz Zator
- Date of birth: September 18, 1994 (age 32)
- Place of birth: Calgary, Alberta, Canada
- Height: 1.88 m (6 ft 2 in)
- Positions: Centre-back; right-back

Team information
- Current team: Oțelul Galați
- Number: 44

Youth career
- CalGlen FC
- Calgary Foothills

College career
Years	Team	Apps	(Gls)
2012–2016	Calgary Dinos	67	(6)

Senior career*
Years	Team	Apps	(Gls)
2015–2016	Calgary Foothills	22	(1)
2017	Whitecaps FC 2	8	(0)
2018	Calgary Foothills	14	(0)
2019–2020	Cavalry FC	37	(2)
2021–2022	York United	52	(2)
2021	→ Vasalund IF (loan)	5	(0)
2023–2025	Korona Kielce	58	(1)
2025	Korona Kielce II	1	(0)
2025–2026	Arka Gdynia	19	(0)
2026–	Oțelul Galați	5	(1)

International career^{‡}
2023–	Canada	3	(0)
- * Club domestic league appearances and goals as of November 1, 2026 ‡ National team caps and goals as of June 6, 2024

Dominick Lukasz Zator (Polish: Dominik Łukasz Zator; born September 18, 1994) is a Canadian professional soccer player who plays as a centre-back or a right-back for Liga I club Oțelul Galați.

== Early Life ==
Dominick Zator was born and raised in Calgary, Alberta to Polish immigrants originating from Niemodlin and Otwock. During his youth, Zator was an active multi-sport athlete, participating in soccer, volleyball, golf, tennis, ice hockey, basketball, and gridiron football.

He began his youth career at age four with CalGlen soccer club before transitioning to the Calgary Foothills FC, where he was quickly identified as a top talent by coaching staff. Zator attended Bishop Carroll High School, graduating in 2012.

== Club career ==
=== Early career ===
Zator played for five seasons with the University of Calgary from 2012 to 2016. While at university, Zator also appeared for USL PDL side Calgary Foothills FC in 2015 and 2016, during which time the club progressed to the 2016 PDL Championship.

=== Whitecaps FC 2 ===
Zator signed his first professional contract with Whitecaps FC 2 of the United Soccer League on March 21, 2017. Upon signing, Zator was described as "a modern day centre back with exceptional pace and athleticism" by Calgary Foothills coach Tommy Wheeldon Jr. In April 2017, Zator made his professional debut for Whitecaps FC 2 in a 3–0 win over Portland Timbers 2. He would spend one season with Whitecaps FC 2 before the club ceased operations after the 2017 season. Zator would not be signed to a USL deal with the Whitecaps new affiliate, Fresno FC.

=== Calgary Foothills ===
Zator would return to Calgary Foothills for the 2018 PDL season. He and the club won the PDL Championship that season, defeating Reading United in the final, with Zator scoring a goal in the game.

=== Cavalry FC ===
Zator signed for Cavalry FC on December 12, 2018. Zator played a key role for Cavalry as they won the spring season of the 2019 Canadian Premier League. Cavalry also found success in the Canadian Championship, defeating fellow Canadian Premier League sides Pacific FC and Forge FC in the first two rounds. Cavalry drew Vancouver Whitecaps FC of Major League Soccer in the third round and they battled to a 0–0 draw in Calgary in the first leg. In the second leg, in Vancouver, Zator scored the winning goal in a 2–1 victory, helping Cavalry become the first Canadian Premier League team to defeat an MLS team and booking a ticket to the semifinals against the Montreal Impact in the process. Zator made 27 league appearances that season, scoring one goal, and also appeared in both legs of the Canadian Premier League Finals.

After a standout season, and training stints with RCD Mallorca and Ross County in the offseason, Zator extended his contract with Cavalry through 2020 on November 28, 2019. He appeared in all ten matches of the shortened 2020 season for Cavalry, scoring one goal. On January 26, 2021, the club announced that Zator had declined a contract extension in order to explore free agency.

=== York United ===
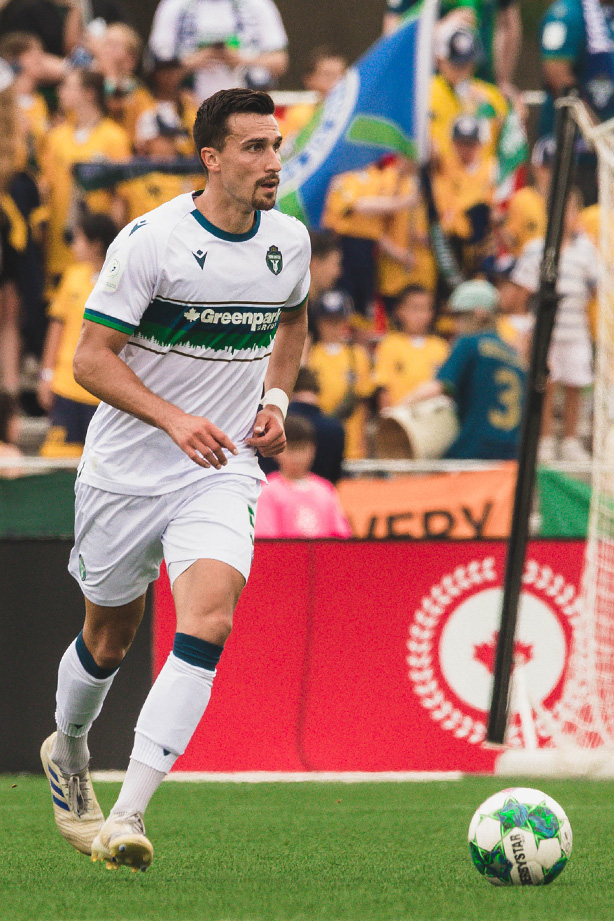
Zator with York United in 2021

On February 1, 2021, Zator signed a two-year contract with York United. The following day, he was sent on a short-term loan to newly promoted Swedish Superettan side Vasalunds IF. On June 1 he was recalled from his loan, amassing five appearances during his time in Sweden. Zator made his debut for York in their season opener against his former club Cavalry FC on June 27. He scored his first goal for York on July 8, netting the game-winner in a 2–1 victory over Valour FC.

=== Korona Kielce ===
In December 2022, Zator joined Ekstraklasa club Korona Kielce on a contract through June 2024. He made his debut for his new club against Legia Warsaw on January 29, 2023. He scored his first goal for Korona Kielce on April 15 against Jagiellonia Białystok. In March 2024, Zator would sign a contract extension with Kielce, keeping with the club through June 2025.

He left the club at the end of the 2024–25 season, having made 65 appearances for the club.

=== Arka Gdynia ===
On June 23, 2025, it was announced that Zator would join newly-promoted Ekstraklasa club Arka Gdynia on a free transfer on 1 July, signing a two-year contract. At the end of the 2025–26 season, in which the club was relegated, Zator terminated his contract by mutual consent, making him a free agent.

=== Oțelul Galați ===
On September 5, 2026, Zator moved to Oțelul Galați from Liga I, signing a two-year contract.

== International career ==
Born in Canada, Zator is of Polish descent. In November 2019, Zator was named to Canada's 23-man squad for a CONCACAF Nations League match against the United States.

In March 2023 Zator was re-called to Canada ahead of two CONCACAF Nations League fixtures against Honduras and Curaçao. In June 2023 Zator was named to the final squad contesting the Nations League Finals. He did not make an appearance in the Semi-final or Final as Canada finished runners-up to the United States.

The day after the Nations League Finals on June 19, Zator was named to the 23-man squad for the 2023 CONCACAF Gold Cup. He made his debut in the tournament opener against Guadeloupe on June 27, as a late substitute for Richie Laryea in a 2–2 draw.

== Career statistics ==
=== Club ===
As of match played November 1, 2026

Appearances and goals by club, season and competition
Club	Season	League			Playoffs		National cup (Note: Includes Canadian Championship, Polish Cup)		Continental		Total	
Club	Season	Division	Apps	Goals	Apps	Goals	Apps	Goals	Apps	Goals	Apps	Goals
Calgary Foothills	2015	Premier Development League	10	0	—		—		—		10	0
Calgary Foothills	2016	Premier Development League	12	1	5	1	—		—		17	2
Calgary Foothills	Total		22	1	5	1	—		—		27	2
Whitecaps FC 2	2017	USL	8	0	—		—		—		8	0
Calgary Foothills	2018	Premier Development League	14	0	4	0	—		—		18	0
Cavalry FC	2019	Canadian Premier League	27	1	2	0	8	2	—		37	3
Cavalry FC	2020	Canadian Premier League	10	1	—		—		—		10	1
Cavalry FC	Total		37	2	2	0	8	2	—		47	4
York United	2021	Canadian Premier League	24	1	1	0	2	0	—		27	1
York United	2022	Canadian Premier League	28	1	—		3	0	—		31	1
York United	Total		52	2	1	0	5	0	—		58	2
Vasalund IF (loan)	2021	Superettan	5	0	—		0	0	—		5	0
Korona Kielce	2022–23	Ekstraklasa	17	1	—		0	0	—		17	1
Korona Kielce	2023–24	Ekstraklasa	34	0	—		4	0	—		38	0
Korona Kielce	2024–25	Ekstraklasa	7	0	—		3	0	—		10	0
Korona Kielce	Total		58	1	—		7	0	—		65	1
Korona Kielce II	2024–25	III liga, gr. IV	1	0	—		—		—		1	0
Arka Gdynia	2025–26	Ekstraklasa	19	0	—		2	0	—		21	0
Oțelul Galați	2026–27	Liga I	5	1	—		—		—		5	1
Career total			221	7	12	1	22	2	0	0	255	10

=== International ===
As of match played June 6, 2024

Appearances and goals by national team and year
National team	Year	Apps	Goals
Canada	2023	2	0
Canada	2024	1	0
Total		3	0

== Honours ==
Calgary Foothills

- PDL Championship: 2018

Cavalry

- Canadian Premier League (Regular season): Spring 2019, Fall 2019
- Canadian Premier League Finals runners-up: 2019
