= Eduardo Jesus =

Brazilian footballer (born 2002)

Eduardo
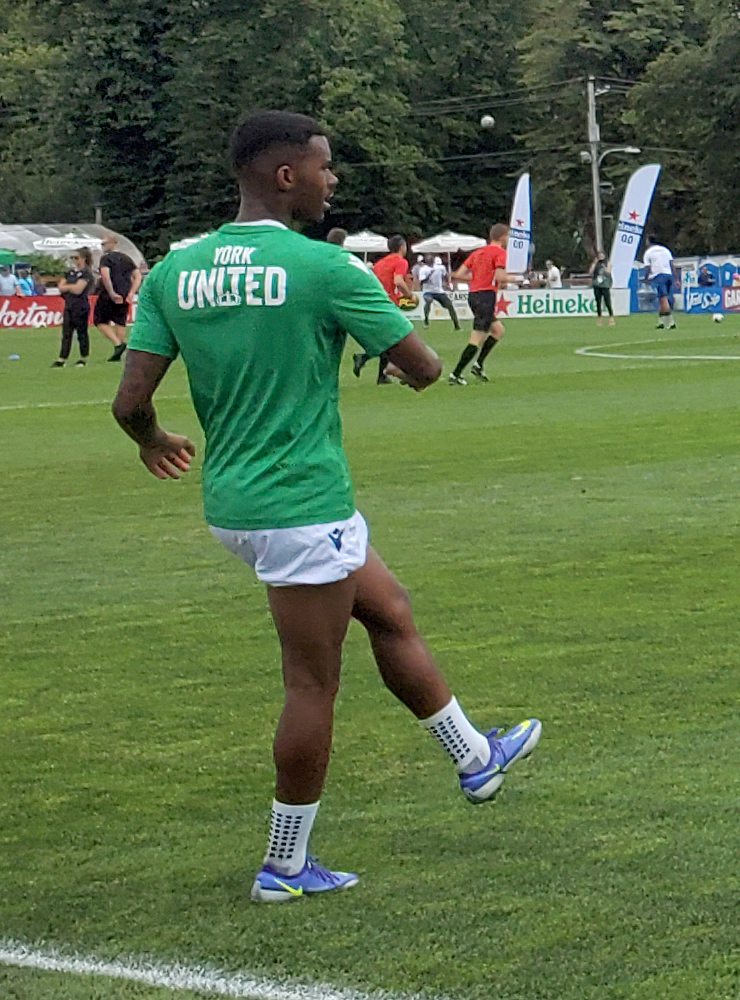
- Eduardo with York United in 2022

Personal information
- Full name: Eduardo Pinto de Jesus
- Date of birth: 17 March 2002 (age 24)
- Place of birth: Salvador, Bahia, Brazil
- Positions: Left-back; midfielder

Team information
- Current team: Brasil de Pelotas

Youth career
- –2021: Vitória
- 2019–2020: → Palmeiras (loan)
- 2020–2021: → Fluminense (loan)
- 2021: Bahia

Senior career*
Years	Team	Apps	(Gls)
2022	York United	14	(0)
2023	Botafogo B	0	(0)
2023	→ Rio Branco AC (loan)	8	(0)

International career^{‡}
2017	Brazil U15		
2018	Brazil U16	1	(0)
2018	Brazil U17	5	(0)
- * Club domestic league appearances and goals as of 8 June 2023 ‡ National team caps and goals as of 17 December 2023

Eduardo Pinto de Jesus (born 17 March 2002), known as Eduardo or Eduardo Jesus, is a Brazilian professional footballer who plays for Brasil de Pelotas.

== Early life ==
Jesus developed at Vitória. In June 2019, he joined Palmeiras on loan. In February 2020, he went on loan to Fluminense. While with Fluminense's U20 side, he also played for their B team.

In April 2021, he signed with Bahia on a permanent contract, joining the U20 team.

== Club career ==
In January 2022, Jesus signed a two-year contract with an option for a further year with Canadian Premier League side York United. On 7 April 2022, he made his professional debut for York, in a 1–0 loss to HFX Wanderers. In December 2022, Jesus' contract was terminated by mutual consent.

In January 2023, he returned to Brazil joining Botafogo B. In June 2023, he was loaned to Rio Branco AC until 4 September 2023 to play with the club in the Copa ES.

== International career ==
In 2017, he played with the Brazil U15 at the 2017 South American U-15 Championship.

Jesus earned a cap with Brazil at the U-16 level, coming on at the end of an 8-1 friendly match victory against Cameroon. In 2018, he was called up by the Brazil U17 to participate in friendly matches in England, making five appearances.
