= Mateo Hernández =

Argentinian foot ball player

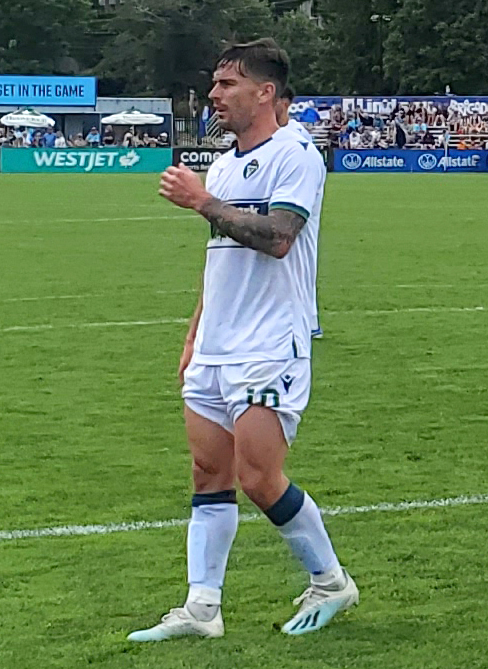
- Hernández in 2022

Personal information
- Date of birth: 5 October 1998 (age 28)
- Place of birth: Santa Fe, Argentina
- Height: 1.78 m (5 ft 10 in)
- Position: Midfielder

Team information
- Current team: Real Tomayapo

Youth career
- Colón

Senior career*
| Years | Team | Apps | (Gls) |
| 2018–2020 | Colón | 5 | (0) |
| 2021–2022 | York United | 16 | (0) |
| 2021 | → Atlético Pantoja (loan) | | |
| 2021 | → Guadalupe (loan) | 19 | (1) |
| 2023– | Real Tomayapo | 0 | (0) |
- * Club domestic league appearances and goals as of 12 October 2022

Mateo Hernández (born 5 October 1998) is an Argentine professional footballer who plays as a midfielder for Real Tomayapo.

== Club career ==
=== Colón ===
Hernández started his career with Argentine Primera División side Colón. He made his professional debut on 30 November 2018 under interim manager Esteban Fuertes, who substituted the midfielder on for Leonardo Heredia in the second half of a fixture with Belgrano. Hernández made six further appearances in 2018–19, which included his Copa Sudamericana bow against Peruvian club Deportivo Municipal. After not featuring competitively in 2019–20, Hernández departed in October 2020.

=== York United ===
On 20 October 2020, Hernández signed with Canadian Premier League team York United. On 12 May 2021, he was loaned to Liga Dominicana de Fútbol side Atlético Pantoja until December 2021. On June 2 he moved on loan with fellow York teammate Lisandro Cabrera to Guadalupe of Costa Rica.

=== Real Tomayapo ===
In December 2022, York United announced Hernández had been transferred to Real Tomayapo of the División Profesional.

== Personal life ==
In March 2020, Hernández was hospitalised and diagnosed with the lowest form of dengue fever; he had contracted the disease following a trip to Paraguay.

== Career statistics ==
As of 20 October 2020.

Club statistics
| Club | Season | League | | | Cup | | League Cup | | Continental | | Other | | Total | |
| Club | Season | Division | Apps | Goals | Apps | Goals | Apps | Goals | Apps | Goals | Apps | Goals | Apps | Goals |
|---|---|---|---|---|---|---|---|---|---|---|---|---|---|---|
| Colón | 2018–19 | Primera División | 5 | 0 | 1 | 0 | 0 | 0 | 1 (Note: Appearance(s) in the Copa Sudamericana) | 0 | 0 | 0 | 7 | 0 |
| Colón | 2019–20 | Primera División | 0 | 0 | 0 | 0 | 0 | 0 | — | | 0 | 0 | 0 | 0 |
| Colón | Total | | 5 | 0 | 1 | 0 | 0 | 0 | 1 | 0 | 0 | 0 | 7 | 0 |
| York United | 2021 | Premier League | 0 | 0 | 0 | 0 | — | | — | | 0 | 0 | 0 | 0 |
| Career total | | | 5 | 0 | 1 | 0 | 0 | 0 | 1 | 0 | 0 | 0 | 7 | 0 |
