= 2022 Forge FC season =

Forge FC
2022 season
- Chairman: Bob Young
- Head coach: Bobby Smyrniotis
- Stadium: Tim Hortons Field
- Canadian Premier League: 2nd
- CPL Playoffs: Champions
- 2020 Canadian Championship: Runners-up
- 2022 Canadian Championship: Quarter-finals
- CONCACAF Champions League: Round of 16
- Top goalscorer: League: Woobens Pacius (10); All: Woobens Pacius (13)
- Highest home attendance: 13,715 (June 4 vs. Toronto FC)
- Lowest home attendance: 1,187 (July 23 vs. Valour FC)
- Average home league attendance: 3,456
Home colours	Away colours

The 2022 Forge FC season was the fourth season in the history of Forge FC. In addition to the Canadian Premier League, the club competed in the 2022 Canadian Championship and the previously delayed final of the 2020 Canadian Championship.

Forge FC began its season in February by competing against Mexican club Cruz Azul in the CONCACAF Champions League, becoming the first Canadian Premier League club to play in the competition.

On October 30, Forge FC defeated Atlético Ottawa 2–0 in the 2022 Canadian Premier League Final to claim their third CPL title.

== Final squad ==
As of October 30, 2022

No.	Name	Nationality	Position(s)	Date of birth (age)	Previous club
Goalkeepers
1	Triston Henry	(Canada)	GK	September 8, 1993 (aged 29)	(Canada) Sigma FC
29	Christopher Kalongo	(Canada)	GK	January 7, 2002 (aged 20)	(Canada) Sigma FC
Defenders
2	Jonathan Grant	(Canada)	RB	October 15, 1993 (aged 29)	(Sweden) Nyköpings BIS
3	Ashtone Morgan	(Canada)	LB	February 9, 1991 (aged 31)	(United States) Real Salt Lake
4	Dominic Samuel	(Canada)	CB / RB	September 29, 1994 (aged 28)	(Canada) Sigma FC
5	Daniël Krutzen	(Belgium)	CB / LB	September 19, 1996 (aged 26)	(United States) Reading United
23	Garven-Michée Metusala	(Haiti)	CB / FB	December 31, 1999 (aged 22)	(Canada) A.S. Blainville
24	Rezart Rama	(Albania)	CB	December 4, 2000 (aged 21)	(England) Nottingham Forest
81	Malik Owolabi-Belewu	(England)	DF	July 3, 2002 (aged 20)	(Italy) S.P.A.L.
Midfielders
10	Kyle Bekker	(Canada)	AM / CM	September 2, 1990 (aged 32)	(United States) North Carolina FC
12	Sebastian Castello	(Canada)	MF	October 8, 2003 (aged 19)	(Canada) Sigma FC
13	Alexander Achinioti-Jönsson	(Sweden)	DM	April 17, 1996 (aged 26)	(Sweden) IFK Värnamo
20	Kwasi Poku	(Canada)	MF	February 6, 2003 (aged 19)	(Canada) Toronto FC II
21	Alessandro Hojabrpour	(Canada)	AM	January 10, 2000 (aged 22)	(Canada) Pacific FC
22	Noah Jensen	(Canada)	MF	July 20, 1999 (aged 23)	(United States) Oakland University
33	Aboubacar Sissoko	(Mali)	MF	October 9, 1995 (aged 27)	(United States) Indy Eleven
Forwards
7	David Choinière	(Canada)	LW / RW	February 7, 1997 (aged 25)	(Canada) Montreal Impact
9	Terran Campbell	(Canada)	ST / LW	October 10, 1998 (aged 24)	(Canada) Pacific FC
11	Chris Nanco	(Canada)	ST / RW / LW	February 15, 1995 (aged 27)	(United States) Bethlehem Steel
14	Emery Welshman	(Guyana)	ST	November 9, 1991 (aged 30)	(Israel) Hapoel Ra'anana A.F.C.
17	Woobens Pacius	(Canada)	FW	May 11, 2001 (aged 21)	(Canada) CF Montréal Academy
19	Tristan Borges	(Canada)	RW / LW / AM	August 26, 1998 (aged 24)	(Belgium) OH Leuven
77	Jordan Hamilton	(Canada)	ST	March 17, 1996 (aged 26)	(Republic of Ireland) Sligo Rovers
Unknown
	Luc Finelli	(Canada)		March 9, 2005 (aged 17)	(Canada) Sigma FC
	Daniel Firek	(Canada)		October 29, 2005 (aged 17)	(Canada) Sigma FC
	Gabriel Goransson	(Canada)		November 3, 2004 (aged 17)	(Canada) Sigma FC
	Matthew Paiva	(Canada)		April 13, 2004 (aged 18)	(Canada) Sigma FC

== Transfers ==
=== In ===
No.	Pos.	Player	From club	Fee/notes	Date	Source
9	FW	(Canada) Terran Campbell	(Canada) Pacific FC	Free	January 11, 2022	
21	MF	(Canada) Alessandro Hojabrpour	(Canada) Pacific FC	Free	January 12, 2022	
3	DF	(Canada) Ashtone Morgan	(United States) Real Salt Lake	Free	February 1, 2022	
20	MF	(Canada) Kwasi Poku	(Canada) Toronto FC II	Free	February 2, 2022	
33	MF	(Mali) Aboubacar Sissoko	(United States) Indy Eleven	Free	February 2, 2022	
28	DF	(Canada) Daniel Stampatori	(Canada) Sigma FC	Signed to a development contract	February 8, 2022	
22	MF	(Canada) Noah Jensen	(United States) Oakland University	Free	February 15, 2022	
16	DF	(Canada) Cale Loughrey	(United States) UAB Blazers	Free	February 15, 2022	
	DF	(France) Guillaume Pianelli	(Canada) UQTR	Selected 7th overall in the 2022 CPL–U Sports Draft	February 15, 2022	
8	MF	(Canada) Simon Triantafillou	(United States) Providence College	Free	February 15, 2022	
36	GK	(Canada) Dino Bontis	(Canada) Toronto FC Academy	Free	April 5, 2022	
	MF	(Canada) Shamit Shome	(Canada) FC Edmonton	Free	April 5, 2022	
81	DF	(England) Malik Owolabi-Belewu	(Italy) S.P.A.L.	Free	April 8, 2022	
24	DF	(Albania) Rezart Rama	(England) Nottingham Forest	Free	May 19, 2022	
6	DF	(Canada) Malcolm Duncan	(Canada) Sigma FC	Short-term contract	June 12, 2022	
8	FW	(Cuba) Orlendis Benítez	(Canada) Vaughan Azzurri	Short-term contract	June 12, 2022	
77	FW	(Canada) Jordan Hamilton	(Republic of Ireland) Sligo Rovers	Free	August 5, 2022	

==== Loans in ====
No.	Pos.	Player	Loaned from	Fee/notes	Date	Source
99	FW	(Panama) Omar Browne	(Panama) Independiente	Season-long loan	January 24, 2022	
19	FW	(Canada) Tristan Borges	(Belgium) OH Leuven	Undisclosed	February 14, 2022	

==== Draft picks ====
Forge FC made the following selections in the 2022 CPL–U Sports Draft. Draft picks are not automatically signed to the team roster. Only those who are signed to a contract will be listed as transfers in.

Round	Selection	Pos.	Player	Nationality	University
1	7	DF	Guillaume Pianelli	France	UQTR
2	15	MF	Mohamed Alshakman	Canada	McMaster University

=== Out ===
No.	Pos.	Player	To club	Fee/notes	Date	Source
9	FW	(Nigeria) Kosi Nwafornso	(Canada) Vaughan Azzurri	Undisclosed	December 31, 2021	
18	FW	(Canada) Molham Babouli	(Qatar) Muaither SC	Free	January 19, 2022	
15	DF	(Canada) Maxim Tissot	(Canada) Atlético Ottawa	Free	January 26, 2022	
8	MF	(Senegal) Elimane Oumar Cissé	(Morocco) US Touarga	Undisclosed		
6	DF	(Canada) Kwame Awuah	(United States) St. Louis City 2	Free	February 28, 2022	
3	DF	(Canada) Dejan Jakovic	(Canada) Serbian White Eagles	Undisclosed	March 11, 2022	
16	DF	(Canada) Klaidi Cela	(Canada) Toronto FC II	Contract expired	March 31, 2022	
27	MF	(Canada) Johnny Son		Undisclosed (Note: Although Son had signed a multi-year contract with Forge FC in 2021, he was not added to the club's roster for the start of the 2022 Canadian Premier League season.)	April 10, 2022	
	DF	(France) Guillaume Pianelli		Undisclosed (Note: Although Pianelli had signed a contract with Forge FC earlier in the year, he was not added to the club's roster for the start of the 2022 Canadian Premier League season.)	April 10, 2022	
8	MF	(Canada) Simon Triantafillou	(Canada) Pacific FC	Undisclosed	April 15, 2022	
31	GK	(Canada) Baj Maan	(Canada) Toronto FC II	Undisclosed (Note: Although Maan had signed a new contract with Forge FC earlier in the year, he was not added to the club's roster for the start of the 2022 Canadian Premier League season.)	May 7, 2022	
24	MF	(Belgium) Paolo Sabak	(Belgium) K.S.C. Lokeren-Temse	Free		

==== Loans out ====
No.	Pos.	Player	Loaned to	Fee/notes	Date	Source
	MF	(Canada) Shamit Shome	(Canada) FC Edmonton	Season-long loan	April 5, 2022	
16	DF	(Canada) Cale Loughrey	(Canada) FC Edmonton	Season-long loan	April 5, 2022	

== Club ==
On January 2, Forge FC reorganized its ownership under the newly announced Hamilton Sports Group, an entity that also took over the ownership of the Hamilton Tiger-Cats and the master licence for Tim Hortons Field. Bob Young continued as the club's chairman and largest shareholder while also welcoming new investment from Hamilton-based steel company Stelco (represented by its chairman and CEO Alan Kestenbaum), club CEO Scott Mitchell, and Woodbine Entertainment CEO Jim Lawson.

=== Kits ===
Forge FC unveiled its 2022 home kit on March 17 and away kit on March 31. The 2022 CONCACAF Champions League began before the new kits were unveiled, requiring the club to continue to wear its 2021 kit for its matches in the competition.

Supplier: Macron / Sponsor: Tim Hortons

Home	Home Alt.	Home 2021	Away

== Pre-season and friendlies ==
Forge FC split its pre-season, playing friendlies both before and after the club's CONCACAF Champions League matches against Cruz Azul.

Win Draw Loss Fixtures

January 29 Friendly	Forge FC	v	Vaughan Azzurri	Mississauga, Ontario
				Referee: Carly Shaw-MacLaren

February 6 Friendly	Forge FC	v	Syracuse Orange	Hamilton, Ontario
				Stadium: Tim Hortons Field

February 9 Friendly	Forge FC	0–1	York United FC	Hamilton, Ontario
			Gutiérrez	Stadium: Tim Hortons Field; Attendance: 0 (Behind-closed-doors); Referee: David Barrie

March 26 Friendly	Forge FC	2–1	HFX Wanderers FC	Hamilton, Ontario
2:00pm	Goal	Report	Santos 75'	Stadium: Tim Hortons Field

March 31 Friendly	Forge FC	1–1	York United FC	Hamilton, Ontario
	Campbell 8'	Report	Gutiérrez 34'	Stadium: Tim Hortons Field

== Competitions ==
Matches are listed in Hamilton local time: Eastern Daylight Time (UTC−4) from March 13 until November 5, and Eastern Standard Time (UTC−5) otherwise.

=== Overview ===
Competition	First match	Last match	Starting round	Final position	Record							
Competition	First match	Last match	Starting round	Final position	Pld	W	D	L	GF	GA	GD	Win %
Canadian Premier League	April 10	October 9	Matchday 1	2nd	28	14	5	9	47	25	+22	50.00
CPL Playoffs	October 15	October 30	Semi-finals	Winners	3	2	1	0	5	2	+3	66.67
2020 Canadian Championship	June 4		Final	Runners-up	1	0	1	0	1	1	+0	0.00
2022 Canadian Championship	May 11	May 25	Preliminary round	Quarter-finals	2	1	0	1	2	3	−1	50.00
CONCACAF Champions League	February 16	February 24	Round of 16	Round of 16	2	0	0	2	1	4	−3	0.00
Total					36	17	7	12	56	35	+21	47.22

Last updated: October 30, 2022
Source: Competitions

=== Canadian Premier League ===
==== Table ====
Pos	Team	Pld	W	D	L	GF	GA	GD	Pts	Qualification
1	Atlético Ottawa (S)	28	13	10	5	36	29	+7	49	Advance to playoffs
2	Forge (C)	28	14	5	9	47	25	+22	47	Advance to playoffs
3	Cavalry	28	14	5	9	39	33	+6	47	Advance to playoffs
4	Pacific	28	13	7	8	36	33	+3	46	Advance to playoffs
5	Valour	28	10	7	11	36	34	+2	37	
6	York United	28	9	7	12	31	37	−6	34	
7	HFX Wanderers	28	8	5	15	24	38	−14	29	
8	FC Edmonton	28	4	8	16	31	51	−20	20	

Source: CanPL.ca
Rules for classification: 1) points; 2) total wins; 3) goal differential; 4) goals for; 5) away goals differential; 6) away goals for; 7) home goals differential; 8) home goals for; 9) U-21 minutes; 10) coin toss or drawing of lots.
(C) Champion; (S) Regular season winner

==== Results by match ====
Match	1	2	3	4	5	6	7	8	9	10	11	12	13	14	15	16	17	18	19	20	21	22	23	24	25	26	27	28
Result	L	D	W	L	D	W	W	W	W	L	L	W	W	W	W	W	W	L	L	D	L	L	W	D	D	W	L	W
Position	6	6	4	7	7	5	4	4	4	4	4	4	4	4	1	1	1	1	2	3	3	3	2	3	2	2	3	2

Updated to match(es) played on October 9, 2022. Source: #Matches
W = Win; D = Draw; L = Loss

==== Matches ====
April 10 1	Pacific FC	2–1	Forge FC	Langford, British Columbia
7:00pm	Díaz 5'; Meilleur-Giguère (yellow card) 49'; Đidić 57'; Mavila (yellow card) 68'; Daniels (yellow card) 81'; Samake (yellow card) 88'	Report	Poku (yellow card) 44'; Achinioti-Jönsson 89'	Stadium: Starlight Stadium; Attendance: 4,038; Referee: Juan Marquez

April 16 2	Forge FC	2–2	Cavalry FC	Hamilton, Ontario
4:00pm	Hojabrpour 3'; Metusala (yellow card) 72'; Choinière 90'	Report	Klomp (yellow card) 5'; Mason 31'; Yao (yellow card) 32'; Musse 39'; Loturi (yellow card) 43'; Escalante (yellow card) 80'	Stadium: Tim Hortons Field; Attendance: 3,688; Referee: Filip Dujic

April 23 3	Forge FC	3–0	FC Edmonton	Hamilton, Ontario
4:00pm	Campbell 34', 69'; Borges 45'; Poku (yellow card) 59'; Pacius (yellow card) 79'	Report	Triantafillou (yellow card) 33'; Singh (yellow card) 64'; Camara (yellow card) 88'	Stadium: Tim Hortons Field; Attendance: 3,133; Referee: David Barrie

May 6 4	York United FC	1–0	Forge FC	Toronto, Ontario
7:00pm	De Rosario (yellow card) 25'; Johnston (yellow card) 57'; Gutiérrez 79', (yellow card) 79'; Verhoeven (yellow card) 90+1'	Report	Sissoko (yellow card) 31'; Poku (yellow card) 72'; Grant (yellow card) 85'	Stadium: York Lions Stadium; Attendance: 1,108; Referee: Fabrizio Stasolla

May 14 5	Forge FC	1–1	Atlético Ottawa	Hamilton, Ontario
4:00pm	Poku (yellow card) 34'; Jensen 46'; Sissoko (yellow card) 50'	Report	Bassett 16'; Haworth (yellow card) 30'; Sissoko (yellow card) 51'; Verhoven (yellow card) 82'; Moragrega (yellow card) 85'	Stadium: Tim Hortons Field; Attendance: 4,127; Referee: Mathieu Souaré

May 20 6	HFX Wanderers FC	0–4	Forge FC	Halifax, Nova Scotia
6:00pm	Rampersad (yellow card) 77'; Samb (yellow card) 83'	Report	Choinière 22', 60'; Bekker (yellow card) 42'; Welshman 52'; Rama (yellow card) 55'; Hojabrpour (yellow card) 60'; Pacius 79'	Stadium: Wanderers Grounds; Attendance: 5,877; Referee: Myriam Marcotte

May 31 7	FC Edmonton	3–4	Forge FC	Edmonton, Alberta
9:00pm	Camara 12'; Hojabrpour 34' (o.g.); Coore 87'; Triantafillou (yellow card) 90+3'	Report	Borges 23', 61', 82' (pen.); Sissoko (yellow card) 42'; Bekker (yellow card) 43'; Bissainthe 64' (o.g.)	Stadium: Clarke Stadium; Attendance: 897; Referee: Mathieu Souaré

June 12 8	Forge FC	3–0	Pacific FC	Hamilton, Ontario
4:00pm	Morgan 11'; Borges 13'; Rama (yellow card) 50'; Pacius 83'	Report	Dada-Luke (yellow card) 24'; Heard (yellow card) 74'	Stadium: Tim Hortons Field; Attendance: 3,111; Referee: David Barrie

June 19 9	HFX Wanderers FC	0–3	Forge FC	Halifax, Nova Scotia
2:00pm	Polisi (yellow card) 63'; Restrepo (red card) 80'	Report	Pacius 15'; Jensen 25'; Choinière (yellow card) 30'; Sissoko (yellow card) 45+1'; Bekker (yellow card) 56'; Morgan (yellow card) 61'; Welshman 84'	Stadium: Wanderers Grounds; Attendance: 6,214; Referee: Scott Bowman

June 29 10	Forge FC	0–1	Valour FC	Hamilton, Ontario
7:00pm	Rama (yellow card) 90+3'	Report	Ponce (yellow card) 31' (yellow-red card) 82'; Akio 61'; Sirois (yellow card) 71'; Levis (yellow card) 79'; Riggi (yellow card) 88'	Stadium: Tim Hortons Field; Attendance: 3,558; Referee: Fabrizio Stasolla

July 3 11	Forge FC	0–1	Atlético Ottawa	Hamilton, Ontario
4:00pm	Borges (yellow card) 83'	Report	Tissot (yellow card) 44'; Bassett 78'	Stadium: Tim Hortons Field; Attendance: 3,519; Referee: Carly Shaw-MacLaren

July 8 12	York United FC	0–2	Forge FC	Toronto, Ontario
7:30pm	Mourdoukoutas (yellow card) 37'; Wilson (yellow card) 48'; Johnston (yellow card) 88'; Hernández (yellow card) 90+1'	Report	Mourdoukoutas 29' (o.g.); Borges (yellow card) 45+1'; Campbell (yellow card) 59'; Morgan (yellow card) 70'; Pacius 77'	Stadium: York Lions Stadium; Attendance: 1,302; Referee: Ben Hoskins

July 19 13	Forge FC	5–1	FC Edmonton	Hamilton, Ontario
6:45pm	Pacius 26', 38' (pen.), 74'; Sissoko 45+1'; Bekker 45+4'	Report	Camara (yellow card) 33'; Coore 57'	Stadium: Tim Hortons Field; Attendance: 3,121; Referee: Mario Al-Ayass

July 23 14	Forge FC	3–1	Valour FC	Hamilton, Ontario
4:30pm	Pacius 40'; Campbell 67', 90+4'	Report	Dyer 23', (yellow card) 55'; Jean-Baptiste (yellow card) 72'; Rendón (yellow card) 84'	Stadium: Tim Hortons Field; Attendance: 1,187; Referee: Mathieu Souaré

July 27 15	Cavalry FC	1–2	Forge FC	Foothills County, Alberta
9:00pm	Mason 1'; Musse (yellow card) 12'; Di Chiara (yellow card) 54'; C. Trafford (yellow card) 70'; Alarcón (yellow card) 79'	Report	Pacius 37'; Bekker 49'; Borges (yellow card) 53'; Henry (yellow card) 67'	Stadium: ATCO Field; Attendance: 2,989; Referee: Yusri Rudolf

July 31 16	Atlético Ottawa	0–4	Forge FC	Ottawa, Ontario
7:00pm	Espejo (yellow card) 34'; Tissot (yellow card) 37'; Sissoko (yellow card) 41'	Report	Sissoko 27'; Campbell 35', 52'; Jensen 76'	Stadium: TD Place Stadium; Attendance: 4,399; Referee: Carly Shaw-MacLaren

August 6 17	Forge FC	1–0	HFX Wanderers FC	Hamilton, Ontario
4:00pm	Pacius 2'; Metusala (yellow card) 42'; Rama (yellow card) 85'; Poku (yellow card) 89'	Report	Schaale (yellow card) 90+2'	Stadium: Tim Hortons Field; Attendance: 3,527; Referee: Michael Venne

August 12 18	Cavalry FC	2–1	Forge FC	Foothills County, Alberta
9:00pm	Mason 7', (yellow card) 48'; Trafford (yellow card) 43'; Klomp (yellow card) 75'; Cantave 90', (yellow card) 90+1'	Report	Henry (yellow card) 41'; Rama (yellow card) 49'; Hamilton 82'	Stadium: ATCO Field; Attendance: 3,945; Referee: Alain Ruch

August 20 19	Forge FC	1–3	York United FC	Hamilton, Ontario
7:00pm	Borges 52', (yellow card) 69'; Bekker (yellow card) 70'; Morgan (yellow card) 89'	Report	De Rosario 7'; Verhoeven (yellow card) 27'; Hernández (yellow card) 40'; N'sa 58', (yellow card) 61'; Babouli 68'	Stadium: Tim Hortons Field; Attendance: 3,867; Referee: Marie-Soleil Beaudoin

August 27 20	Atlético Ottawa	0–0	Forge FC	Ottawa, Ontario
6:30pm	Bahous (yellow card) 76'; Acosta (yellow card) 89'	Report	Campbell (yellow card) 41'	Stadium: TD Place Stadium; Attendance: 4,560; Referee: Filip Dujic

August 31 21	Valour FC	1–0	Forge FC	Winnipeg, Manitoba
8:00pm	de Brienne 20'; Levis (yellow card) 37'; Gutiérrez (yellow card) 49'; Dyer (yellow card) 82' (yellow-red card) 90+9'; Mekidèche (yellow card) 82'	Report	Hojabrpour (yellow card) 14'; Sissoko (yellow card) 30'; Grant (yellow card) 82'; Rama (yellow card) 82'; Henry (yellow card) 90+8'; Borges (yellow card) 90+9'; Welshman (yellow card) 90+10'	Stadium: IG Field; Attendance: 3,384; Referee: Yusri Rudolf
Note: This match was originally scheduled for May 1, but was postponed due to League Covid Protocols. It was rescheduled to August 31.

September 4 22	Valour FC	1–0	Forge FC	Winnipeg, Manitoba
2:00pm	Fordyce (yellow card) 31'; Levis 73'; Riggi (yellow card) 75' (yellow-red card) 90+3'; Cebara (yellow card) 81'; de Brienne (yellow card) 88'	Report	Rama (yellow card) 17'; Hojabrpour (yellow card) 50'; Borges (yellow card) 90+3'	Stadium: IG Field; Attendance: 2,846; Referee: Fabrizio Stasolla

September 10 23	Forge FC	2–1	Cavalry FC	Hamilton, Ontario
5:00pm	Choinière 10'; Rama (yellow card) 38'; Sissoko 52'; Pacius (yellow card) 69'; Bekker (red card) 70'; Borges (yellow card) 72'	Report	Escalante (yellow card) 45'; Musse 63'; Cantave (yellow card) 72' (yellow-red card) 90+5'; Di Chiara (red card) 86'	Stadium: Tim Hortons Field; Attendance: 4,992; Referee: Mathieu Souaré

September 18 24	Pacific FC	1–1	Forge FC	Langford, British Columbia
8:00pm	Achinioti-Jönsson 17' (o.g.); Dixon (yellow card) 18'; Meilleur-Giguère (yellow card) 27'	Report	Hojabrpour 4', (yellow card) 21'; Poku (yellow card) 66'; Metusala (yellow card) 70'	Stadium: Starlight Stadium; Attendance: 3,350; Referee: Filip Dujic

September 25 25	FC Edmonton	1–1	Forge FC	Edmonton, Alberta
5:00pm	Smith 67'; Singh (yellow card) 75' (yellow-red card) 90+3'	Report	Loughrey 60' (o.g.); Samuel (yellow card) 72'	Stadium: Clarke Stadium; Attendance: 984; Referee: Renzo Villanueva

October 1 26	Forge FC	2–0	York United FC	Hamilton, Ontario
5:00pm	Pacius (yellow card) 31'; Owolabi-Belewu 55'; Sissoko 69'	Report	Baldisimo (yellow card) 89'	Stadium: Tim Hortons Field; Attendance: 5,129; Referee: Fabrizio Stasolla

October 5 27	Forge FC	0–1	Pacific FC	Hamilton, Ontario
7:00pm	Owolabi-Belewu (yellow card) 11'; Achinioti-Jönsson (yellow card) 85'	Report	Brown 60', (yellow card) 68'; Heard (yellow card) 82'	Stadium: Tim Hortons Field; Attendance: 2,412; Referee: Pierre-Luc Lauzière
Note: This match was originally scheduled for August 16, but was rescheduled after Pacific FC advanced to the CONCACAF League Round of 16.

October 9 28	Forge FC	1–0	HFX Wanderers FC	Hamilton, Ontario
1:00pm	Poku 8'; Welshman (yellow card) 68'; Metusala (yellow card) 90+2'	Report	Lamothe (yellow card) 19'; Campagna (yellow card) 88'	Stadium: Tim Hortons Field; Attendance: 3,016; Referee: Filip Dujic

==== Playoff matches ====
October 15 SF leg 1	Cavalry FC	1–1	Forge FC	Foothills County, Alberta
4:00 pm	Klomp 42'; Musse (yellow card) 53'; Alarcón (yellow card) 63'; M. Trafford (yellow card) 90'	Report	Owolabi-Belewu (yellow card) 39'; Hojabrpour (yellow card) 45+2'; Pacius 47'; Bekker (yellow card) 90'	Stadium: ATCO Field; Attendance: 3,179; Referee: Alain Ruch

October 23 SF leg 2	Forge FC	2–1 (3–2 agg.)	Cavalry FC	Hamilton, Ontario
5:00 pm	Bekker (red card) 43'; Choinière 69'; Pacius 75' (pen.); Rama (yellow card) 79'	Report	Norman (yellow card) 25' (yellow-red card) 45+3'; Bevan 78', (yellow card) 81'	Stadium: Tim Hortons Field; Attendance: 7,133; Referee: Yusri Rudolf

October 30 Final	Atlético Ottawa	0–2	Forge FC	Ottawa, Ontario
6:00 pm	Camus (yellow card) 41'; Bassett (yellow card) 77'; Pérez (yellow card) 90+2'	Report	Rama (yellow card) 18'; Hojabrpour 28'; Choinière (yellow card) 33', (goal) 78'	Stadium: TD Place Stadium; Attendance: 14,992; Referee: Filip Dujic

=== 2020 Canadian Championship ===
The 2020 Canadian Championship Final was delayed nearly two years due to the COVID-19 pandemic.

June 4, 2022 Final	Forge FC	1–1 (4–5 p)	Toronto FC	Hamilton, Ontario
7:00pm	Achinioti-Jönsson (yellow card) 25'; Owolabi-Belewu (yellow card) 55'; Borges 60', (yellow card) 67'; Morgan (yellow card) 77'; Hojabrpour (yellow card) 81'	Report	Petrasso (yellow card) 19'; MacNaughton (yellow card) 42'; Pozuelo 57', (yellow card) 62'; Akinola (yellow card) 42'	Stadium: Tim Hortons Field; Attendance: 13,715; Referee: Silviu Petrescu
	Penalties
	Achinioti-Jönsson (penalty scored); Campbell (penalty scored); Pacius (penalty scored); Bekker (penalty missed); Choinière (penalty scored); Poku (penalty missed)		(penalty scored) Jiménez; (penalty scored) Salcedo; (penalty missed) Kerr; (penalty scored) Pozuelo; (penalty scored) Perruzza; (penalty scored) Thompson

=== 2022 Canadian Championship ===
May 11 Preliminary round	Forge FC	2–0	CS Mont-Royal Outremont	Hamilton, Ontario
7:00pm	Sissoko (yellow card) 15'; Campbell 34'; Welshman (yellow card) 36'; Nanco (yellow card) 39'; Hojabrpour (yellow card) 45'; Pacius 90+2'	Report	Ouzane (yellow card) 42'	Stadium: Tim Hortons Field; Attendance: 2,213; Referee: Yusri Rudolf

May 25 Quarter-finals	CF Montréal	3–0	Forge FC	Montreal, Quebec
7:00pm	Ibrahim 14', 22', 49'; Brault-Guillard (yellow card) 84'	Report	Hojabrpour (yellow card) 26'; Sissoko (yellow card) 47'; Castello (yellow card) 89'	Stadium: Stade Saputo; Referee: Pierre-Luc Lauzière

=== CONCACAF Champions League ===
==== Round of 16 ====
February 16 Leg 1	Forge FC (Canada)	0–1	(Mexico) Cruz Azul	Hamilton, Ontario
8:00pm	Bekker (yellow card) 86'	Report	Otero (yellow card) 29', (goal) 30'; Baca (yellow card) 89'	Stadium: Tim Hortons Field; Attendance: 4,688; Referee: Armando Villarreal

February 24 Leg 2	Cruz Azul (Mexico)	3–1 (4–1 agg.)	(Canada) Forge FC	Mexico City, Mexico
8:30pm	Romero 5'; Baca 21'; Escobar 44'	Report	Choinière 26'; Poku (yellow card) 86'	Stadium: Estadio Azteca; Attendance: 28,724; Referee: Walter López Ramos

== Statistics ==
=== Squad and statistics ===
As of October 30, 2022

No.	Pos	Nat	Player	Total		Canadian Premier League		CPL Playoffs		2020 Canadian Championship		2022 Canadian Championship		CONCACAF Champions League	
No.	Pos	Nat	Player	Apps	Goals	Apps	Goals	Apps	Goals	Apps	Goals	Apps	Goals	Apps	Goals
1	GK	(Canada) CAN	Triston Henry	35	0	27+0	0	3+0	0	1+0	0	2+0	0	2+0	0
2	DF	(Canada) CAN	Jonathan Grant	7	0	0+7	0	0+0	0	0+0	0	0+0	0	0+0	0
3	DF	(Canada) CAN	Ashtone Morgan	27	1	17+3	1	3+0	0	1+0	0	1+0	0	2+0	0
4	DF	(Canada) CAN	Dominic Samuel	24	0	10+8	0	0+3	0	0+0	0	1+0	0	2+0	0
5	DF	(Belgium) BEL	Daniël Krutzen	4	0	2+0	0	2+0	0	0+0	0	0+0	0	0+0	0
7	FW	(Canada) CAN	David Choinière	34	7	20+6	4	3+0	2	1+0	0	1+1	0	2+0	1
9	FW	(Canada) CAN	Terran Campbell	34	7	16+11	6	0+2	0	1+0	0	2+0	1	2+0	0
10	MF	(Canada) CAN	Kyle Bekker	31	2	24+1	2	2+0	0	1+0	0	1+0	0	2+0	0
11	FW	(Canada) CAN	Chris Nanco	11	0	1+7	0	0+0	0	0+0	0	1+0	0	0+2	0
12	MF	(Canada) CAN	Sebastian Castello	7	0	0+6	0	0+0	0	0+0	0	0+1	0	0+0	0
13	MF	(Sweden) SWE	Alexander Achinioti-Jönsson	35	1	27+0	1	3+0	0	1+0	0	2+0	0	2+0	0
14	FW	(Canada) CAN	Emery Welshman	25	2	5+15	2	0+0	0	0+1	0	2+0	0	0+2	0
17	FW	(Canada) CAN	Woobens Pacius	35	13	21+6	10	3+0	2	0+1	0	0+2	1	0+2	0
19	FW	(Canada) CAN	Tristan Borges	31	7	21+2	6	3+0	0	1+0	1	1+1	0	2+0	0
20	MF	(Canada) CAN	Kwasi Poku	25	1	10+9	1	0+1	0	0+1	0	1+1	0	1+1	0
21	MF	(Canada) CAN	Alessandro Hojabrpour	34	3	24+2	2	3+0	1	1+0	0	2+0	0	1+1	0
22	MF	(Canada) CAN	Noah Jensen	26	3	6+16	3	1+0	0	0+0	0	0+2	0	0+1	0
23	DF	(Haiti) HAI	Garven Metusala	29	0	17+5	0	0+3	0	0+0	0	2+0	0	2+0	0
24	DF	(Albania) ALB	Rezart Rama	24	0	19+0	0	3+0	0	1+0	0	1+0	0	0+0	0
29	GK	(Canada) CAN	Christopher Kalongo	1	0	1+0	0	0+0	0	0+0	0	0+0	0	0+0	0
33	MF	(Mali) MLI	Aboubacar Sissoko	35	4	27+0	4	3+0	0	1+0	0	2+0	0	2+0	0
77	FW	(Canada) CAN	Jordan Hamilton	12	1	2+8	1	0+2	0	0+0	0	0+0	0	0+0	0
81	DF	(England) ENG	Malik Owolabi-Belewu	23	1	11+7	1	1+2	0	1+0	0	0+1	0	0+0	0
Player(s) on loan but featured this season
16	DF	(Canada) CAN	Cale Loughrey	1	0	0+0	0	0+0	0	0+0	0	0+0	0	0+1	0
Player(s) transferred out during this season
6	DF	(Canada) CAN	Malcolm Duncan	2	0	0+2	0	0+0	0	0+0	0	0+0	0	0+0	0
8	FW	(Cuba) CUB	Orlendis Benítez	3	0	0+3	0	0+0	0	0+0	0	0+0	0	0+0	0
27	FW	(Canada) CAN	Marcus Caldeira	4	0	0+3	0	0+0	0	0+0	0	0+1	0	0+0	0
28	DF	(Canada) CAN	Daniel Stampatori	2	0	0+2	0	0+0	0	0+0	0	0+0	0	0+0	0

=== Goal scorers ===
Rank	Nat.	Player	Pos.	Canadian Premier League	CPL Playoffs	2020 Canadian Championship	2022 Canadian Championship	CONCACAF Champions League	TOTAL
1	(Canada)	Woobens Pacius	FW	10	2	0	1	0	13
2	(Canada)	Tristan Borges	FW	6	0	1	0	0	7
2	(Canada)	Terran Campbell	FW	6	0	0	1	0	7
2	(Canada)	David Choinière	FW	4	2	0	0	1	7
5	(Mali)	Aboubacar Sissoko	MF	4	0	0	0	0	4
6	(Canada)	Alessandro Hojabrpour	MF	2	1	0	0	0	3
6	(Canada)	Noah Jensen	MF	3	0	0	0	0	3
8	(Canada)	Kyle Bekker	MF	2	0	0	0	0	2
8	(Guyana)	Emery Welshman	FW	2	0	0	0	0	2
10	(Sweden)	Alexander Achinioti-Jönsson	MF	1	0	0	0	0	1
10	(Canada)	Jordan Hamilton	FW	1	0	0	0	0	1
10	(Canada)	Ashtone Morgan	DF	1	0	0	0	0	1
10	(England)	Malik Owolabi-Belewu	DF	1	0	0	0	0	1
10	(Canada)	Kwasi Poku	MF	1	0	0	0	0	1
Own goals				3	0	0	0	0	3
Totals				47	5	1	2	1	56

=== Clean sheets ===
Rank	Nat.	Player	Canadian Premier League	CPL Playoffs	2020 Canadian Championship	2022 Canadian Championship	CONCACAF Champions League	TOTAL
1	(Canada)	Triston Henry	10	1	0	1	0	12
Totals			10	1	0	1	0	12

=== Disciplinary record ===
No.	Pos.	Nat.	Player	Canadian Premier League		CPL Playoffs		2020 Canadian Championship		2022 Canadian Championship		CONCACAF Champions League		TOTAL	
No.	Pos.	Nat.	Player	Yellow card	Red card	Yellow card	Red card	Yellow card	Red card	Yellow card	Red card	Yellow card	Red card	Yellow card	Red card
1	GK	(Canada)	Triston Henry	3	0	0	0	0	0	0	0	0	0	3	0
2	DF	(Canada)	Jonathan Grant	2	0	0	0	0	0	0	0	0	0	2	0
3	DF	(Canada)	Ashtone Morgan	3	0	0	0	1	0	0	0	0	0	4	0
4	DF	(Canada)	Dominic Samuel	1	0	0	0	0	0	0	0	0	0	1	0
7	FW	(Canada)	David Choinière	1	0	1	0	0	0	0	0	0	0	2	0
9	FW	(Canada)	Terran Campbell	2	0	0	0	0	0	0	0	0	0	2	0
10	MF	(Canada)	Kyle Bekker	4	1	1	1	0	0	0	0	1	0	6	2
11	FW	(Canada)	Chris Nanco	0	0	0	0	0	0	1	0	0	0	1	0
12	MF	(Canada)	Sebastian Castello	0	0	0	0	0	0	1	0	0	0	1	0
13	MF	(Sweden)	Alexander Achinioti-Jönsson	1	0	0	0	1	0	0	0	0	0	2	0
14	FW	(Guyana)	Emery Welshman	2	0	0	0	0	0	1	0	0	0	3	0
17	FW	(Canada)	Woobens Pacius	3	0	0	0	0	0	0	0	0	0	3	0
19	FW	(Canada)	Tristan Borges	7	0	0	0	1	0	0	0	0	0	8	0
20	MF	(Canada)	Kwasi Poku	6	0	0	0	0	0	0	0	1	0	7	0
21	MF	(Canada)	Alessandro Hojabrpour	4	0	1	0	1	0	2	0	0	0	8	0
23	DF	(Haiti)	Garven Metusala	4	0	0	0	0	0	0	0	0	0	4	0
24	DF	(Albania)	Rezart Rama	8	0	2	0	0	0	0	0	0	0	10	0
33	MF	(Mali)	Aboubacar Sissoko	5	0	0	0	0	0	2	0	0	0	7	0
81	DF	(England)	Malik Owolabi-Belewu	1	0	1	0	1	0	0	0	0	0	3	0
Totals				56	1	6	1	5	0	7	0	2	0	76	2

== Honours ==
=== Canadian Premier League Awards ===
Name	Award	Status	Source
Alexander Achinioti-Jönsson	Defender of the Year	Won	
Alexander Achinioti-Jönsson	Player of the Year	Nominated	
Alexander Achinioti-Jönsson	Players' Player of the Year	Nominated	
Kyle Bekker	Players' Player of the Year	Nominated	
Woobens Pacius	Players' Player of the Year	Nominated	
Woobens Pacius	Canadian U-21 Player of the Year	Nominated	
Bobby Smyrniotis	Coach of the Year	Nominated	

==== Monthly Awards ====
Month	Name	Award	Source
July	Bobby Smyrniotis	Manager of the Month	
July	Woobens Pacius	Player of the Month	
October	Bobby Smyrniotis	Manager of the Month	
October	David Choinière	Player of the Month	

== Sources ==
- "Club roster: 2022 Scotiabank Concacaf Champions League" (PDF). CONCACAF. February 7, 2022. p. 10. Archived (PDF) from the original on February 8, 2022.
- Anderson, Kevin (November 6, 2022). "Forge Season in Review". 13th Man Sports. Archived from the original on November 6, 2022.
- Urciuoli, Anthony (host) (November 16, 2022). Forge FC 2022 Season in Review: Part One - Defensive Third. Forge FC – via YouTube.
- Urciuoli, Anthony (host) (November 21, 2022). Forge FC 2022 Season in Review: Part Two - Middle Third. Forge FC – via YouTube.
- Urciuoli, Anthony (host) (November 30, 2022). Forge FC 2022 Season in Review: Part Three - Final Third. Forge FC – via YouTube.
