= 2022 Atlético Ottawa season =

Atlético Ottawa
2022 season
- CEO: Fernando Lopez
- Head coach: Carlos González
- Stadium: TD Place Stadium
- Canadian Premier League: 1st
- CPL Playoffs: Runner-up
- Canadian Championship: Preliminary Round
- Top goalscorer: League: Ollie Bassett (8); All: Ollie Bassett (8)
- Highest home attendance: 14,992 (October 30 vs. Forge FC)
- Lowest home attendance: 1,893 (May 10 vs. York United FC)
- Average home league attendance: 4,069
- Biggest win: 3–0 @ York United (July 24); 3–0 @ Cavalry FC (August 21)
- Biggest defeat: 1–6 vs. Valour (April 24)
Home colours	Away colours

The 2022 Atlético Ottawa season was the third season in the history of Atlético Ottawa. In addition to the Canadian Premier League, the club competed in the Canadian Championship. This was the club's first season under head coach Carlos González after the departure of Mista following the 2021 season.

== Current squad ==
As of September 1, 2022

No.	Name	Nationality	Position(s)	Date of birth (age)	Previous club
Goalkeepers
1	Sean Melvin	(Canada)	GK	July 9, 1994 (aged 28)	(United States) Colorado Springs Switchbacks
29	Nathan Ingham	(Canada)	GK	January 27, 1993 (aged 29)	(Canada) York United FC
Defenders
2	Drew Beckie (Captain)	(Canada)	CB / RB	September 30, 1990 (aged 32)	(United States) El Paso Locomotive
3	Macdonald Niba	(Cameroon)	CB	August 8, 1994 (aged 28)	(Finland) Kuopion Palloseura
4	Diego Espejo	(Spain)	CB	August 18, 2002 (aged 20)	(Spain) Atlético Madrid B
5	Sergio Camus	(Spain)	RB / CB	April 9, 1997 (aged 25)	(Spain) Atlético Madrid B
15	Maxim Tissot	(Canada)	LB / DM	April 13, 1992 (aged 30)	(Canada) Forge FC
17	Miguel Acosta (3rd Captain)	(Spain)	RB / LB / CB	March 16, 1998 (aged 24)	(Spain) Atlético Baleares
33	Iván Pérez	(Spain)	LB	October 20, 1992 (aged 30)	(Spain) UD San Sebastián
46	Zachary Roy	(Canada)	RB	June 24, 2003 (aged 19)	(Canada) CS St-Hubert
	Gabriel Carvalho	(Canada)	CB	February 18, 2006 (aged 16)	(Canada) West Ottawa SC
Midfielders
6	Chris Mannella	(Canada)	DM / CM	June 7, 1994 (aged 28)	(Canada) York United FC
7	Keven Alemán	(Canada)	AM / RW	March 25, 1994 (aged 28)	(Canada) Valour FC
8	Ben McKendry (2nd Captain)	(Canada)	DM / CM	March 25, 1993 (aged 29)	(Sweden) Nyköpings BIS
10	Ollie Bassett	(Northern Ireland)	AM / LW	March 6, 1998 (aged 24)	(Canada) Pacific FC
14	Owen Antoniuk	(Canada)	MF	August 26, 2002 (aged 20)	(Canada) Whitecaps FC 2
16	Zach Verhoven	(Canada)	LW / RW / RB	August 17, 1998 (aged 24)	(Canada) Pacific FC
20	Abdou Sissoko	(Mali)	DM / CB	March 20, 1990 (aged 32)	Kuwait SC
22	Zakaria Bahous	(Canada)	MF	August 5, 2001 (aged 21)	(Canada) FC Laval
	Omar Darwish	(Canada)	DM	January 30, 2005 (aged 17)	(Canada) West Ottawa SC
	Anthony Domanico	(Canada)	MF		(Canada) Ottawa South United
Forwards
9	Brian Wright	(Canada)	CF	March 24, 1995 (aged 27)	(United States) Birmingham Legion FC
11	Vladimir Moragrega	(Mexico)	CF	July 26, 1998 (aged 24)	(Mexico) Atlético San Luis
13	Ballou Tabla	(Canada)	LW / RW	March 31, 1999 (aged 23)	(Canada) CF Montréal
19	Malcolm Shaw	(Canada)	CF / RW	July 27, 1995 (aged 27)	(Sweden) Assyriska IK
45	Carl Haworth	(Canada)	RW / RB	July 9, 1989 (aged 33)	(United States) Indy Eleven

== Transfers ==
=== In ===
==== Transferred in ====
No.	Pos.	Player	From club	Fee/notes	Date	Source
3	DF	(Cameroon) Macdonald Niba	(Finland) Kuopion Palloseura	Free transfer	January 26, 2022	
7	MF	(Canada) Keven Alemán	(Canada) Valour FC	Free transfer	January 26, 2022	
10	MF	(Northern Ireland) Ollie Bassett	(Canada) Pacific FC	Free transfer	January 26, 2022	
15	DF	(Canada) Maxim Tissot	(Canada) Forge FC	Free transfer	January 26, 2022	
22	MF	(Canada) Zakaria Bahous	(Canada) FC Laval	Free transfer	January 26, 2022	
29	GK	(Canada) Nathan Ingham	(Canada) York United FC	Free transfer	January 26, 2022	
1	GK	(Canada) Sean Melvin	(United States) Colorado Springs Switchbacks	Free transfer	February 4, 2022	
46	DF	(Canada) Zachary Roy	(Canada) CS St-Hubert	Free transfer	February 4, 2022	
45	FW	(Canada) Carl Haworth	(United States) Indy Eleven	Free transfer	February 10, 2022	
13	FW	(Canada) Ballou Tabla	(Canada) CF Montréal	Free transfer	February 15, 2022	
20	MF	(Mali) Abdou Sissoko	Kuwait SC	Free transfer	March 10, 2022	
21	DF	(Portugal) José Cunha	(Canada) CBU Capers	Selected 1st overall in the 2022 CPL–U Sports Draft	April 1, 2022	
33	DF	(Spain) Iván Pérez	(Spain) UD San Sebastián	Free transfer	July 1, 2022	
	DF	(Canada) Gabriel Carvalho	(Canada) West Ottawa SC	Signed to a Development Contract	August 31, 2022	
	MF	(Canada) Omar Darwish	(Canada) West Ottawa SC	Signed to a Development Contract	August 31, 2022	
	MF	(Canada) Anthony Domanico	(Canada) Ottawa South United	Signed to a Development Contract	September 1, 2022	

==== Loans in ====
No.	Pos.	Player	Loaned from	Fee/notes	Date	Source
11	FW	(Mexico) Vladimir Moragrega	(Mexico) Atlético San Luis	Season-long loan	February 22, 2022	
4	DF	(Spain) Diego Espejo	(Spain) Atlético Madrid B	Season-long loan	February 22, 2022	
33	DF	(Spain) Iván Pérez	(Spain) UD San Sebastián	Short-term loan (until June 30, 2022)	May 12, 2022	
14	MF	(Canada) Owen Antoniuk	(Canada) Vancouver Whitecaps	Season-long loan	July 18, 2022	
5	DF	(Spain) Sergio Camus	(Spain) Atlético Madrid B	Season-long loan	August 10, 2022	

==== Draft picks ====
Atlético Ottawa made the following selections in the 2022 CPL–U Sports Draft. Draft picks are not automatically signed to the team roster. Only those who were signed to a contract will be listed as transfers in.

Round	Selection	Pos.	Player	Nationality	University
1	1	DF	José Cunha	Portugal	Cape Breton University
2	9	FW	Julien Bruce	France	Université de Montréal

=== Out ===
==== Transferred out ====
No.	Pos.	Player	To club	Fee/notes	Date	Source
1	GK	(Canada) Dylon Powley	Retired	Option declined	November 30, 2021	
3	DF	(Canada) Milovan Kapor	(Slovakia) FK Pohronie	Contract expired	November 30, 2021	
4	DF	(Canada) Brandon John		Contract expired	November 30, 2021	
5	MF	(Spain) Viti Martínez	(Andorra) Inter Club d'Escaldes	Option declined	November 30, 2021	
7	MF	(Trinidad and Tobago) Ryan Telfer	(United States) Columbus Crew 2	Option declined	November 30, 2021	
9	FW	(Canada) Shawn-Claud Lawson	(Canada) Simcoe County Rovers	Option declined	November 30, 2021	
10	MF	(Spain) Alberto Soto	(Spain) Atlético Madrid B	Loan expired	November 30, 2021	
11	MF	(Canada) Antoine Coupland	(Croatia) HNK Rijeka	Contract expired	November 30, 2021	
13	GK	(Serbia) Teodor Obadal	(Serbia) FK Kabel	Option declined	November 30, 2021	
18	MF	(Jamaica) Tevin Shaw	(United States) FC Tucson	Option declined	November 30, 2021	
20	DF	(Canada) Nyal Higgins	(Canada) Toronto FC II	Loan expired	November 30, 2021	
21	DF	(Canada) Myles Cornwall	(United States) Fort Wayne FC	Contract expired	November 30, 2021	
22	MF	(Dominican Republic) Rafael Núñez	(Spain) Club Atlético de Madrid Juvenil	Loan expired	November 30, 2021	
23	DF	(Canada) Matthew Arnone		Option declined	November 30, 2021	
28	MF	(Canada) Mamadou Ba	(Canada) CF Montréal U23	Development contract expired	November 30, 2021	
33	DF	(Canada) Keesean Ferdinand	(Canada) CF Montréal U23	Loan expired	November 30, 2021	
44	DF	(England) Vashon Neufville	(England) Walton Casuals	Contract expired	November 30, 2021	
91	MF	(Canada) Jaeden Mercure	(Canada) Ottawa South United	Development contract expired	November 30, 2021	
99	FW	(Spain) Raúl Uche	(Spain) Salamanca CF UDS	Option declined	November 30, 2021	
21	MF	(Portugal) José Cunha	(Canada) CBU Capers	Development Contract Expired	August 6, 2022	

== Pre-season friendlies ==
11 March 2022 Friendly	Atlético Ottawa	4–1	(Spain) Palencia	Alcalá de Henares, Spain
16:30 CET				Stadium: Centro Deportivo Wanda Alcalá de Henares

17 March 2022 Friendly	Atlético Ottawa	0–4	(Spain) Internacional Madrid	Alcalá de Henares, Spain
11:05 CET			Martín; Reguera; Mancebo	Stadium: Centro Deportivo Wanda Alcalá de Henares

23 March 2022 Friendly	Real Madrid Castilla (Spain)	3–1	Atlético Ottawa	Valdebebas, Spain
11:35 CET	9'; 65'	Report	Espejo 31'	Stadium: Ciudad Real Madrid

29 March 2022 Friendly	Leganés B (Spain)	1–3	Atlético Ottawa	Leganés, Spain
11:40 CET	7'	Report	Wright 20'; Haworth 65'; Shaw 67'	Stadium: Instalación Deportiva Butarque

3 April 2022 Friendly	Atlético Ottawa	2–0	CF Montréal U23	Ottawa, Ontario
11:00 ET	Wright 38'; Moragrega 89'	Report		Stadium: TD Place Stadium

== Competitions ==
=== Canadian Premier League ===
==== Table ====
Pos	Team	Pld	W	D	L	GF	GA	GD	Pts	Qualification
1	Atlético Ottawa (S)	28	13	10	5	36	29	+7	49	Advance to playoffs
2	Forge (C)	28	14	5	9	47	25	+22	47	Advance to playoffs
3	Cavalry	28	14	5	9	39	33	+6	47	Advance to playoffs
4	Pacific	28	13	7	8	36	33	+3	46	Advance to playoffs
5	Valour	28	10	7	11	36	34	+2	37	
6	York United	28	9	7	12	31	37	−6	34	
7	HFX Wanderers	28	8	5	15	24	38	−14	29	
8	FC Edmonton	28	4	8	16	31	51	−20	20	

Source: CanPL.ca
Rules for classification: 1) points; 2) total wins; 3) goal differential; 4) goals for; 5) away goals differential; 6) away goals for; 7) home goals differential; 8) home goals for; 9) U-21 minutes; 10) coin toss or drawing of lots.
(C) Champion; (S) Regular season winner

==== Results summary ====
Overall								Home						Away					
Pld	W	D	L	GF	GA	GD	Pts	W	D	L	GF	GA	GD	W	D	L	GF	GA	GD
28	13	10	5	36	29	+7	49	5	6	3	14	19	−5	8	4	2	22	10	+12

Source: Matches

==== Results by match ====
Match	1	2	3	4	5	6	7	8	9	10	11	12	13	14	15	16	17	18	19	20	21	22	23	24	25	26	27	28
Result	W	W	L	D	L	D	W	W	W	D	L	W	W	D	D	W	L	W	L	W	W	D	D	D	D	W	W	D
Position	3	2	2	2	5	6	3	3	2	3	3	2	2	2	2	1	4	3	4	3	1	1	1	1	1	1	1	1

Updated to match(es) played on October 9, 2022. Source: Matches
W = Win; D = Draw; L = Loss

==== Matches ====
April 9 1	Atlético Ottawa	1–0	Cavalry FC	Ottawa, Ontario
3:00pm ET	Espejo (yellow card) 16'; Wright 81' (pen.); Beckie (red card) 85'	Report	Camargo (yellow card) 19'; Fisk (yellow card) 32'; Klomp (yellow card) 36'; Escalante (yellow card) 81'	Stadium: TD Place Stadium; Attendance: 4,172; Referee: Fabrizio Stasolla

April 16 2	Atlético Ottawa	1–0	HFX Wanderers FC	Ottawa, Ontario
1:00pm ET	McKendry (yellow card) 45'; Bassett (yellow card) 56'; Shaw 81'	Report	Bent (yellow card) 31'; Lamothe (yellow card) 56'; Santos (yellow card) 87'	Stadium: TD Place Stadium; Attendance: 3,122; Referee: Mathieu Souaré

April 24 3	Atlético Ottawa	1–6	Valour FC	Ottawa, Ontario
3:00pm ET	Sirois 40' (o.g.); McKendry (yellow card) 72'	Report	Romeo (yellow card) 8', (goal) 45'; Dyer 14' (pen.), 50'; Riggi 27', 45+2'; Levis 69'; Catavolo (yellow card) 74'	Stadium: TD Place Stadium; Attendance: 3,345; Referee: Scott Bowman

April 29 4	York United FC	2–2	Atletico Ottawa	North York, Ontario
7:30pm ET	Abzi (yellow card) 40' De Rosario 64' (pen.) Toussaint (red card) 90+2' Ricci (yellow card) 90+2' Zator 90+5'	Report	Wright 51'; Ingham (yellow card) 63'; Tabla 86'; Tissot (yellow card) 90+6'	Stadium: York Lions Stadium; Attendance: 1,043; Referee: Filip Dujic

May 7 5	Atlético Ottawa	0–1	Pacific FC	Ottawa, Ontario
6:00pm ET	Sissoko (yellow card) 77'	Report	Díaz 72'; Đidić (yellow card) 77'	Stadium: TD Place Stadium; Attendance: 3,555; Referee: Yusri Rudolf

May 14 6	Forge FC	1–1	Atlético Ottawa	Hamilton, Ontario
4:00pm ET	Poku (yellow card) 34'; Jensen 46'; Sissoko (yellow card) 50'	Report	Bassett 16'; Haworth (yellow card) 30'; Sissoko (yellow card) 51'; Verhoven (yellow card) 82'; Moragrega (yellow card) 85'	Stadium: Tim Hortons Field; Attendance: 4,127; Referee: Mathieu Souare

May 22 7	FC Edmonton	1–2	Atlético Ottawa	Edmonton, Alberta
4:00pm ET	Singh (yellow card) 66' (yellow-red card) 80'; Warschewski 74' (pen.); Higgins (yellow card) 90+4'; Mohammed (yellow card) 90+5'	Report	Tissot (yellow card) 22'; Wright 40'; Bassett 70' (pen.)	Stadium: Clarke Stadium; Attendance: 1,275; Referee: Alain Ruch

June 1 8	Valour FC	0–1	Atlético Ottawa	Winnipeg, Manitoba
8:00pm ET	Levis (yellow card) 10'; Riggi (yellow card) 26'; Fordyce (yellow card) 62'; Rea (yellow card) 90+2'; Romeo (yellow card) 90+7'	Report	Tabla (yellow card) 18'; Acosta (yellow card) 37'; Verhoven 84'; Moragrega (yellow card) 87'; Beckie (yellow card) 90+7'	Stadium: IG Field; Attendance: 2,699; Referee: Filip Dujic

June 5 9	Atlético Ottawa	2–1	Pacific FC	Ottawa, Ontario
1:00pm ET	Shaw 62'; Bahous (yellow card) 66'; Verhoven (yellow card) 78'; Verhoven 86'	Report	Mavila (yellow card) 33'; dos Santos (yellow card) 65'; Dada-Luke (yellow card) 78'; Heard 83'	Stadium: TD Place Stadium; Attendance: 4,176; Referee: Ben Hoskins

June 14 10	Atlético Ottawa	0–0	York United FC	Ottawa, Ontario
7:00pm ET	Bahous (yellow card) 32'; Moragrega (yellow card) 45+1'; Beckie (yellow card) 58' (yellow-red card) 82'; Wright (yellow card) 90+1'	Report	Abzi (yellow card) 10'; Hernández (yellow card) 37'; Toussaint (red card) 90+2'; Kane (yellow card) 90+3'	Stadium: TD Place Stadium; Attendance: 3,950; Referee: Mathieu Souaré

June 19 11	FC Edmonton	1–0	Atlético Ottawa	Edmonton, Alberta
5:00pm ET	Higgins (yellow card) 57'; Bissainthe 65'	Report	Bassett (yellow card) 26'; Sissoko (yellow card) 64'	Stadium: Clarke Stadium; Attendance: 1,177; Referee: Michael Venne

June 30 12	HFX Wanderers FC	0–2	Atlético Ottawa	Halifax, Nova Scotia
6:30pm ET	Salter (yellow card) 56' (yellow-red card) 69'; Schaale (yellow card) 83'	Report	Tabla (yellow card) 17'; McKendry (yellow card) 24'; Espejo (yellow card) 50'; Bassett 70', (yellow card) 90'; Acosta 87'	Stadium: Wanderers Grounds; Attendance: 6,500; Referee: Ben Hoskins

July 3 13	Forge FC	0–1	Atlético Ottawa	Hamilton, Ontario
4:00pm ET	Borges (yellow card) 83'	Report	Tissot (yellow card) 44'; Bassett 78'	Stadium: Tim Hortons Field; Attendance: 3,519; Referee: Carly Shaw-MacLaren

July 9 14	Atlético Ottawa	1–1	Cavalry FC	Ottawa, Ontario
7:00pm ET	Tabla 47'; Acosta (yellow card) 75'	Report	Escalante 20'; M. Trafford (yellow card) 84'	Stadium: TD Place Stadium; Attendance: 3,900; Referee: Renzo Villanueva

July 20 15	Atlético Ottawa	1–1	Valour FC	Ottawa, Ontario
7:00pm ET	Moragrega 15' (pen.)	Report	Dyer 10' (pen.), (yellow card) 90+4'; Ponce (yellow card) 77'; Baquero (yellow card) 83'	Stadium: TD Place Stadium; Attendance: 2,571; Referee: Filip Dujic
Note: This match was originally scheduled for July 17, but was postponed due to League Covid Protocols and rescheduled to July 20.

July 24 16	York United FC	0–3	Atlético Ottawa	Toronto, Ontario
2:00pm ET	Thompson (yellow card) 62'	Report	Tabla 11' (pen.); Wright 35'; Bassett 62' (pen.); Bahous (yellow card) 90+1'	Stadium: York Lions Stadium; Attendance: 1,187; Referee: Mohammad Mohseni

July 31 17	Atlético Ottawa	0–4	Forge FC	Ottawa, Ontario
7:00pm ET	Espejo (yellow card) 34'; Tissot (yellow card) 37'; Sissoko (yellow card) 41'	Report	Sissoko 27'; Campbell 35', 52'; Jensen 76'	Stadium: TD Place Stadium; Attendance: 4,399; Referee: Carly Shaw-MacLaren

August 7 18	Atlético Ottawa	2–1	FC Edmonton	Ottawa, Ontario
2:00pm	Tabla 70', 75'; Niba (yellow card) 90'; Antoniuk (yellow card) 90'; Alemán (yellow card) 90+5'	Report	Camara (yellow card) 62'; Warschewski 86'; Mohammed (yellow card) 90+2'	Stadium: TD Place Stadium; Attendance: 6,574; Referee: Myriam Marcotte

August 13 19	Pacific FC	1–0	Atlético Ottawa	Langford, British Columbia
5:00pm ET	Heard 8', (yellow card) 80'; Bustos (yellow card) 29'	Report	Moragrega (yellow card) 19'; Beckie (yellow card) 89'	Stadium: Starlight Stadium; Attendance: 3,244; Referee: David Barrie

August 17 20	Atlético Ottawa	3–2	HFX Wanderers FC	Ottawa, Ontario
7:00pm ET	Alemán 21'; Espejo (yellow card) 25'; Tissot 51'; Moragrega (yellow card) 82'; Pérez 90+1'; Sissoko (yellow card) 90+2'	Report	Tabi (yellow card) 47'; Lamothe 58'; Gagnon-Laparé (yellow card) 62'; Salter 90+1' (pen.)	Stadium: TD Place Stadium; Attendance: 4,281; Referee: Renzo Villanueva

August 21 21	Cavalry FC	0–3	Atlético Ottawa	Calgary, Alberta
5:30pm	Trafford (yellow card) 9'; Escalante (yellow card) 66'	Report	Alemán 45+2'; Beckie (yellow card) 64'; Alemán (yellow card) 75'; Wright 79'; Bassett 89'	Stadium: ATCO Field; Attendance: 3,727

August 27 22	Atlético Ottawa	0–0	Forge FC	Ottawa, Ontario
6:30pm ET	Bahous (yellow card) 76'; Acosta (yellow card) 89'		Campbell (yellow card) 41'	Stadium: TD Place Stadium; Attendance: 4,560; Referee: Filip Dujic

September 2 23	Atlético Ottawa	0–0	FC Edmonton	Ottawa, Ontario
7:00pm ET	Bassett (yellow card) 43'; Sissoko (yellow card) 50'; Espejo (yellow card) 90+4'	Report	Shome (yellow card) 8'; Bissainte (yellow card) 27'; Camara (yellow card) 78'; Loughrey (yellow card) 90'	Stadium: TD Place Stadium; Attendance: 4,053; Referee: Ben Hoskins

September 11 24	Pacific FC	1–1	Atlético Ottawa	Langford, British Columbia
4:00pm ET	Đidić 45+3'; Young (yellow card) 35'; Dada-Luke (yellow card) 69'; Đidić (yellow card) 90+3'	Report	Bassett 26' (pen.); Tabla (yellow card) 30'; Espejo (yellow card) 90+5'	Stadium: Starlight Stadium; Attendance: 2,645; Referee: Alain Ruch

September 18 25	Valour FC	1–1	Atlético Ottawa	Winnipeg, Manitoba
5:00pm ET	Jean-Baptiste 68'	Report	Bassett 78'; Camus (yellow card) 41'; Shaw (yellow card) 63'; Alemán (yellow card) 85'	Stadium: IG Field; Attendance: 5,227; Referee: Mathieu Venne

September 24 26	Cavalry FC	1–3	Atlético Ottawa	Calgary, Alberta
5:30pm ET	Escalante 79' (pen.); Trafford (yellow card) 34'; Alarcón (yellow card) 75'	Report	Tabla 4'; Wright 54'; Shaw 86'; Sissoko (yellow card) 17'; Espejo (yellow card) 30'; Tabla (yellow card) 79'	Stadium: ATCO Field; Attendance: 4,424; Referee: Filip Dujic

October 1 27	HFX Wanderers FC	1–2	Atlético Ottawa	Halifax, Nova Scotia
2:00pm ET	Salter 79'; Omar (yellow card) 25'; Gagnon-Laparé (yellow card) 61'	Report	Tissot 40'; Bahous 57'; Tissot (yellow card) 30'; Acosta (yellow card) 71'; Wright (yellow card) 76'; Bassett (yellow card) 78'; McKendry (yellow card) 88'	Stadium: Wanderers Grounds; Attendance: 5,944; Referee: Mathieu Venne

October 9 28	Atlético Ottawa	2–2	York United FC	Ottawa, Ontario
6:00pm ET	Tissot 25'; Wright 43'; Haworth (yellow card) 23'; Beckie (yellow card) 58'; Alemán (yellow card) 72'	Report	De Rosario 62', (yellow card) 63'; Wilson 79'; dos Santos (yellow card) 11'; Mourdoukoutas (yellow card) 55'; Babouli (yellow card) 63'	Stadium: TD Place Stadium; Attendance: 4,303; Referee: Alain Ruch

==== Playoff matches ====
October 15 SF Leg 1	Pacific FC	0–2	Atlético Ottawa	Langford, British Columbia
7:00pm ET	Didic (yellow card) 10'; Heard (yellow card) 73'	Report	Tabla (yellow card) 63', (goal) 79'; Camus (yellow card) 70'; Espejo (yellow card) 75'; Haworth (yellow card) 77'; Bahous (yellow card) 90+1'; Verhoven 90+4'	Stadium: Starlight Stadium; Attendance: 3,759; Referee: Mathieu Souaré

October 23 SF Leg 2	Atlético Ottawa	1–1 (3–1 agg.)	Pacific FC	Ottawa, Ontario
2:00pm ET	Shaw 83', (yellow card) 84'	Report	Meilleur-Giguère 28', (yellow card) 77'; Bustos (yellow card) 43'; Samake (yellow card) 64'; Young (yellow card) 85'	Stadium: TD Place Stadium; Attendance: 8,482; Referee: Jean-Luc Lauzière

October 30 Final	Atlético Ottawa	0–2	Forge FC	Ottawa, Ontario
6:00pm ET	Camus (yellow card) 41'; Bassett (yellow card) 77'; Pérez (yellow card) 90+2'	Report	Rama (yellow card) 18'; Hojabrpour 28'; Choinière (yellow card) 33', (goal) 78'	Stadium: TD Place Stadium; Attendance: 14,992; Referee: Filip Dujic

=== Canadian Championship ===
May 10 Preliminary Round	Atlético Ottawa	1–1 (6–7 p)	York United	Ottawa, Ontario
7:00pm ET	Acosta (yellow card) 21'; Bassett (yellow card) 57'; Shaw 61'; Espejo (yellow card) 66'; Moragrega (yellow card) 67'; Haworth (yellow card) 87'	Report	Abzi 31'; Wilson (yellow card) 45+3'; Toussaint (yellow card) 53'; N'sa (yellow card) 81'; Ricci (yellow card) 88'	Stadium: TD Place Stadium; Attendance: 1,893; Referee: Pierre-Luc Lauzière
	Penalties
	Haworth (penalty scored); Wright (penalty missed); Shaw (penalty scored); Alemán (penalty scored); Bassett (penalty scored); Sissoko (penalty scored); Beckie (penalty scored); McKendry (penalty missed)		(penalty missed) De Rosario; (penalty scored) Abzi; (penalty scored) Zator; (penalty scored) Wilson; (penalty scored) Hernández; (penalty scored) Johnston; (penalty scored) Jesus; (penalty scored) Toussaint
Note: York United FC's goalkeeper coach Benzi Camilo was sent off (red card) in the 88th minute for violent conduct.

== Statistics ==
=== Squad and statistics ===
As of October 30, 2022

No.	Pos	Nat	Player	Total		Canadian Premier League		Canadian Championship	
No.	Pos	Nat	Player	Apps	Goals	Apps	Goals	Apps	Goals
2	DF	(Canada) CAN	Drew Beckie	27	0	18+8	0	1+0	0
3	DF	(Cameroon) CMR	Macdonald Niba	17	0	9+7	0	1+0	0
4	DF	(Spain) ESP	Diego Espejo	28	0	27+0	0	1+0	0
5	DF	(Spain) ESP	Sergio Camus	11	0	7+4	0	0+0	0
6	MF	(Canada) CAN	Chris Mannella	6	0	0+6	0	0+0	0
7	MF	(Canada) CAN	Keven Alemán	24	2	9+14	2	0+1	0
8	MF	(Canada) CAN	Ben McKendry	28	0	13+14	0	0+1	0
9	FW	(Canada) CAN	Brian Wright	28	7	18+9	7	0+1	0
10	MF	(Northern Ireland) NIR	Ollie Bassett	31	8	30+0	8	1+0	0
11	FW	(Mexico) MEX	Vladimir Moragrega	23	1	6+16	1	1+0	0
13	FW	(Canada) CAN	Ballou Tabla	31	7	28+2	7	1+0	0
14	MF	(Canada) CAN	Owen Antoniuk	5	0	3+2	0	0+0	0
15	DF	(Canada) CAN	Maxim Tissot	31	3	30+0	3	1+0	0
16	DF	(Canada) CAN	Zach Verhoven	16	3	3+12	3	1+0	0
17	DF	(Spain) ESP	Miguel Acosta	30	1	26+3	1	1+0	0
19	FW	(Canada) CAN	Malcolm Shaw	24	5	15+8	4	0+1	1
20	MF	(France) FRA	Abdoul Sissoko	29	0	25+3	0	1+0	0
21	DF	(Portugal) POR	José Cunha	2	0	2+0	0	0+0	0
22	MF	(Canada) CAN	Zakaria Bahous	29	1	19+10	1	0+0	0
29	GK	(Canada) CAN	Nathan Ingham	29	0	28+0	0	1+0	0
33	DF	(Spain) ESP	Iván Pérez	9	1	1+8	1	0+0	0
45	FW	(Canada) CAN	Carl Haworth	27	0	14+12	0	0+1	0
46	DF	(Canada) CAN	Zachary Roy	13	0	4+9	0	0+0	0

=== Top scorers ===
Rank	Nat.	Player	Pos.	Canadian Premier League	Canadian Championship	Total
1	(Northern Ireland)	Ollie Bassett	MF	8	0	8
2	(Canada)	Brian Wright	FW	7	0	7
2	(Canada)	Ballou Tabla	MF	7	0	7
4	(Canada)	Malcolm Shaw	FW	4	1	5
5	(Canada)	Maxim Tissot	DF	3	0	3
5	(Canada)	Zach Verhoven	MF	3	0	3
7	(Canada)	Keven Alemán	MF	2	0	2
8	(Spain)	Miguel Acosta	DF	1	0	1
8	(Mexico)	Vladimir Moragrega	FW	1	0	1
8	(Spain)	Iván Pérez	DF	1	0	1
8	(Canada)	Zakaria Bahous	MF	1	0	1
Totals				38	1	39

=== Top assists ===
Rank	Nat.	Player	Pos.	Canadian Premier League	Canadian Championship	Total
1	(Canada)	Carl Haworth	FW	4	1	5
2	(Canada)	Ballou Tabla	MF	4	0	4
3	(Spain)	Miguel Acosta	DF	3	0	3
3	(Northern Ireland)	Ollie Bassett	MF	3	0	3
5	(Canada)	Brian Wright	FW	2	0	2
5	(Canada)	Maxim Tissot	DF	2	0	2
5	(Canada)	Ben McKendry	MF	2	0	2
5	(Canada)	Zach Verhoven	MF	2	0	2

Note: 4 others tied at 1

=== Clean sheets ===
Rank	Nat.	Player	Canadian Premier League	Canadian Championship	TOTAL
1	(Canada)	Nathan Ingham	9	0	9
2	(Canada)	Sean Melvin	1	0	1
Totals			10	0	10

=== Disciplinary record ===
No.	Pos.	Nat.	Player	Canadian Premier League		Canadian Championship		TOTAL	
No.	Pos.	Nat.	Player	Booked	Sent off (straight red)	Booked	Sent off (straight red)	Booked	Sent off (straight red)
2	DF	(Canada)	Drew Beckie	6	2	0	0	6	2
3	DF	(Cameroon)	Macdonald Niba	1	0	0	0	1	0
4	DF	(Spain)	Diego Espejo	8	0	0	0	8	0
5	DF	(Spain)	Sergio Camus	3	0	0	0	3	0
7	MF	(Canada)	Keven Alemán	4	0	0	0	4	0
8	MF	(Canada)	Ben McKendry	4	0	0	0	4	0
9	FW	(Canada)	Brian Wright	2	0	0	0	2	0
10	MF	(Northern Ireland)	Ollie Bassett	6	0	1	0	7	0
11	FW	(Mexico)	Vladimir Moragrega	5	0	1	0	6	0
13	FW	(Canada)	Ballou Tabla	5	0	0	0	5	0
14	MF	(Canada)	Owen Antoniuk	1	0	0	0	1	0
15	DF	(Canada)	Maxim Tissot	5	0	0	0	5	0
16	MF	(Canada)	Zach Verhoven	2	0	0	0	2	0
17	DF	(Spain)	Miguel Acosta	4	0	1	0	5	0
19	FW	(Canada)	Malcolm Shaw	2	0	0	0	2	0
20	MF	(Mali)	Abdoul Sissoko	7	0	0	0	7	0
22	MF	(Canada)	Zakaria Bahous	5	0	0	0	5	0
29	GK	(Canada)	Nathan Ingham	1	0	0	0	1	0
33	DF	(Spain)	Iván Pérez	1	0	0	0	1	0
45	FW	(Canada)	Carl Haworth	3	0	1	0	4	0
Totals				75	2	3	0	78	2
