= 2022 Canadian Premier League final =

Soccer match

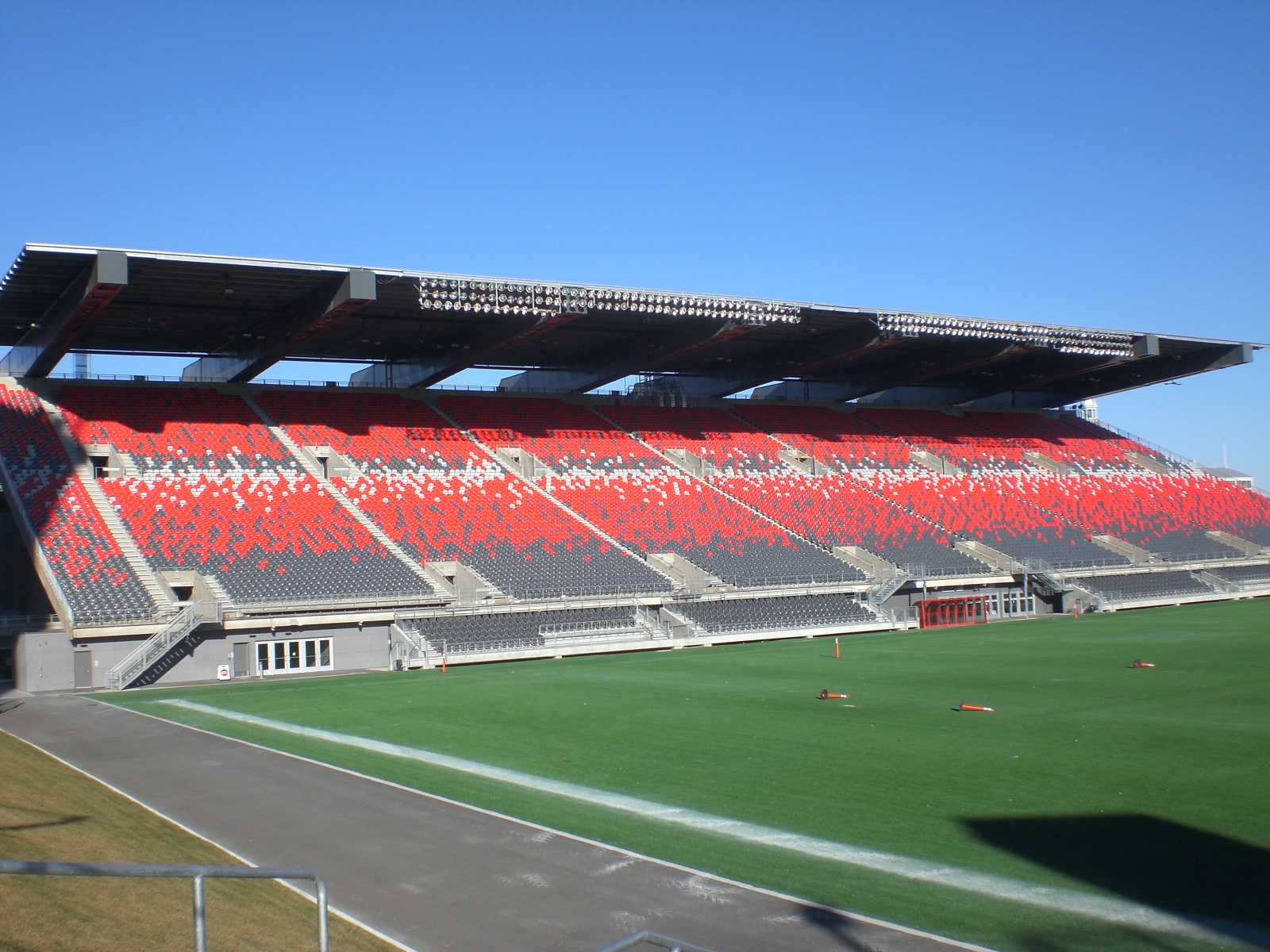
- TD Place Stadium
- Event: 2022 Canadian Premier League season
Atlético Ottawa	Forge FC
0	2
- Date: October 30, 2022
- Venue: TD Place Stadium, Ottawa, Ontario
- Player of the Match: David Choinière (Forge FC)
- Referee: Filip Dujic
- Attendance: 14,992
- Weather: Mostly cloudy 13 °C (55 °F); 38% humidity

The 2022 Canadian Premier League final was a soccer match that was the 4th edition of the CPL Finals, the post-season championship of the Canadian Premier League, the top level of Canadian soccer. The match determined the winner of the 2022 Canadian Premier League season and was played on October 30, 2022, in Ottawa, Ontario. It was contested by Atlético Ottawa and Forge FC, the winners of the league's two semifinal matchups. Pacific FC were the defending champions, but were eliminated in the semifinals by Atlético Ottawa.

Forge FC defeated Atlético Ottawa 2–0 to claim their record-extending third CPL title. Alessandro Hojabrpour scored the opening goal in the 28th minute, which turned out to be the match winner. David Choinière scored in the 78th minute and was named player of the match.

== Teams ==
Team	City	Previous finals appearances (bold indicates winners)
Atlético Ottawa	Ottawa, Ontario	None
Forge FC	Hamilton, Ontario	3 (**2019**, **2020**, 2021)

== Path to the Final ==
The 2022 CPL season was contested by eight teams. Each team played four games against each of the seven opponents for a total of 28 matches. The top-four teams from the regular season qualified for the playoffs which began on October 15, 2022. The first round featured two-legged semifinals where the first-place team from the season faced the fourth, and the second-place team played the third. Atlético Ottawa and Forge FC were the winners and advanced to the CPL Final, a single match to be hosted by the higher-seeded team.

Pos	Team	Pld	W	D	L	GF	GA	GD	Pts	Qualification
1	Atlético Ottawa (S)	28	13	10	5	36	29	+7	49	Advance to playoffs
2	Forge (C)	28	14	5	9	47	25	+22	47	Advance to playoffs
3	Cavalry	28	14	5	9	39	33	+6	47	Advance to playoffs
4	Pacific	28	13	7	8	36	33	+3	46	Advance to playoffs
5	Valour	28	10	7	11	36	34	+2	37	
6	York United	28	9	7	12	31	37	−6	34	
7	HFX Wanderers	28	8	5	15	24	38	−14	29	
8	FC Edmonton	28	4	8	16	31	51	−20	20	

Source: CanPL.ca
Rules for classification: 1) points; 2) total wins; 3) goal differential; 4) goals for; 5) away goals differential; 6) away goals for; 7) home goals differential; 8) home goals for; 9) U-21 minutes; 10) coin toss or drawing of lots.
(C) Champion; (S) Regular season winner

=== Semifinal results ===
Team 1	Agg.	Team 2	1st leg	2nd leg
Pacific FC	1–3	**Atlético Ottawa**	0–2	1–1
Cavalry FC	2–3	**Forge FC**	1–1	1–2

=== Atlético Ottawa ===
Improving on a last place finish in 2021, Atlético Ottawa finished the 2022 season with 49 points, capturing the league's regular season title. They then defeated fourth-ranked Pacific FC in the semifinal by a score of 3–1 to advance to their first Final.

=== Forge FC ===
Forge FC competed in their fourth consecutive Final following wins against Cavalry FC in 2019 and HFX Wanderers FC in 2020, as well as a defeat to Pacific FC in the 2021 Final. Forge finished the regular season in second place, two points behind Atlético Ottawa.

=== Head-to-head ===
Ottawa and Forge met four times during the season with each team recording one win, one loss, and two draws. The two teams conceded the fewest goals in the CPL in 2022 with Ottawa allowing 29 goals and Forge, 25 goals.

== Pre-match ==
Forge was without their captain Kyle Bekker in the Final because he received a red card in the second leg of the semifinals against rivals Cavalry FC, resulting in a suspension. Forge appealed the suspension and were able to get it reduced to two games; however, Bekker remained ineligible for the Final.

On the Friday prior to the Final, Alexander Achinioti-Jönsson of Forge FC earned CPL Defender of the Year honours, while Atlético Ottawa's Carlos González was named Coach of the Year and Ollie Bassett was named Player of the Year and Players' Player of the Year.

=== Broadcasting ===
The CPL Final was broadcast on OneSoccer in Canada and globally. Internationally, the match was broadcast by Fox Sports in the United States, BT Sport in the United Kingdom and Ireland, Flow Sports in the Caribbean, and Hi! Sports TV in Mexico.

== Match details ==
=== Summary ===
==== First half ====
The match was played in front of a crowd of 14,992 fans at TD Place Stadium. Defender Diego Espejo returned to Atlético Ottawa's lineup after serving a suspension in leg 2 of the semifinals. Forge stuck with their usual 4–3–3 formation, inserting Noah Jensen into the lineup for the suspended Kyle Bekker.

Forge FC began the match on the offensive with Atlético absorbing pressure and looking to counter-attack. Alessandro Hojabrpour opened the scoring for Forge in the 28th minute on a header from a free kick by Tristan Borges, his second goal in as many finals. Atlético began playing more offensively late in the first half seeking to score an equalizer before half time, but were unable to get a shot on goal.

==== Second half ====
Forge came out strong to begin the second half with Borges and Aboubacar Sissoko forcing Atlético goalkeeper Nathan Ingham to make a pair of early big saves. In the 75th minute, Sergio Camus came close to scoring an equalizer for Atlético but was denied by Forge goalkeeper Triston Henry.

David Choinière scored a second goal for Forge in the 78th minute to make the score 2–0. While both teams made several tactical substitutions in the later stages of the match, neither team scored any additional goals, resulting in Forge winning 2–0.

Forge held a larger share of ball possession time in the match (55 per cent to 45 per cent) and completed more passes than Atlético (453 to 377). Following the match, the CPL announced that David Choinière was the player of the match.

=== Details ===
October 30, 2022
6:00 pm ET

Atlético Ottawa	0–2	Forge FC
	Recap; Report	Hojabrpour 28'; Choinière 78'

TD Place Stadium, Ottawa, Ontario
Attendance: 14,992
Referee: Filip Dujic

**Atlético Ottawa**	**Forge**

GK	29	(Canada) Nathan Ingham
RB	17	(Spain) Miguel Acosta
CB	4	(Spain) Diego Espejo
CB	5	(Spain) Sergio Camus	(yellow card) 41'
LB	15	(Canada) Maxim Tissot		(substituted off) 82'
DM	20	(France) Abdoul Sissoko
RW	45	(Canada) Carl Haworth (c)		(substituted off) 74'
CM	10	(Northern Ireland) Ollie Bassett	(yellow card) 77'	(substituted off) 82'
CM	13	(Canada) Ballou Tabla
LW	22	(Canada) Zakaria Bahous		(substituted off) 57'
CF	19	(Canada) Malcolm Shaw
Substitutes:
GK	1	(Canada) Sean Melvin
DF	2	(Canada) Drew Beckie
MF	7	(Canada) Keven Alemán		(substituted on) 57'
MF	8	(Canada) Ben McKendry
FW	9	(Canada) Brian Wright		(substituted on) 74'
DF	16	(Canada) Zach Verhoven		(substituted on) 82'
DF	33	(Spain) Iván Pérez	(yellow card) 90+2'	(substituted on) 82'
Manager: (Spain) Carlos González

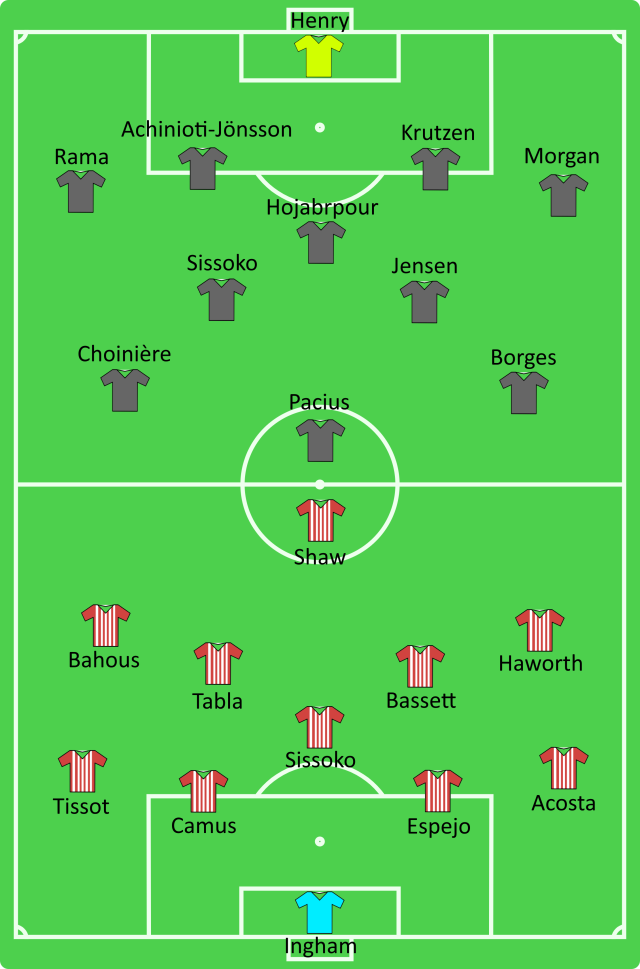

GK	1	(Canada) Triston Henry
RB	24	(Albania) Rezart Rama	(yellow card) 18'
CB	13	(Sweden) Alexander Achinioti-Jönsson
CB	5	(Netherlands) Daniël Krutzen (c)
LB	3	(Canada) Ashtone Morgan		(substituted off) 78'
CM	33	(Mali) Aboubacar Sissoko
CM	21	(Canada) Alessandro Hojabrpour
CM	22	(Canada) Noah Jensen		(substituted off) 71'
RW	7	(Canada) David Choinière	(yellow card) 33'
LW	19	(Canada) Tristan Borges		(substituted off) 84'
CF	17	(Canada) Woobens Pacius		(substituted off) 84'
Substitutes:
GK	29	(Canada) Christopher Kalongo
DF	4	(Canada) Dominic Samuel		(substituted on) 78'
FW	9	(Canada) Terran Campbell
MF	20	(Canada) Kwasi Poku
DF	24	(Haiti) Garven Metusala		(substituted on) 71'
FW	77	(Canada) Jordan Hamilton		(substituted on) 84'
DF	81	(England) Malik Owolabi-Belewu		(substituted on) 84'
Manager: (Canada) Bobby Smyrniotis

Player of the Match:
David Choinière (Forge FC)

Assistant referees:
Gabrielle Lemieux
Peter Pendli
Fourth official:
Alain Ruch

**Match rules**

- 90 minutes
- 30 minutes of extra time if necessary
- Penalty shoot-out if score still level
- Maximum of five substitutions, with a sixth allowed in extra time

=== Statistics ===
Overall
Statistic	Atlético Ottawa	Forge FC
Goals scored	0	2
Total shots	7	12
Shots on target	3	4
Blocked shots	3	3
Ball possession	45%	55%
Passes	378	454
Corner kicks	3	8
Fouls conceded	14	11
Offsides	0	1
Yellow cards	3	2
Red cards	0	0

== Post-match ==
Having made it to four consecutive CPL Finals and having now won three of them, the Canadian Premier League and members of the media declared Forge FC to be a dynasty.

The CPL later named Bobby Smyrniotis as the Manager of the Month for October and David Choinière as the Player of the Month for October for their roles in leading Forge to the championship.

== See also ==
- Canadian Premier League Finals
- 2022 Canadian Championship Final
