= Guillaume Pianelli =

French soccer player (born 1998)

Personal information
- Full name: Guillaume Pianelli-Balisoni
- Date of birth: 1 May 1998 (age 28)
- Place of birth: Bastia, France
- Height: 1.90 m (6 ft 3 in)
- Position: Defender

Youth career
- SC Bastia

College career
Years	Team	Apps	(Gls)
2019–	UQTR Patriotes	24	(3)

Senior career*
Years	Team	Apps	(Gls)
2016–2017	SC Bastia II	4	(0)
2017	SC Bastia	0	(0)
2018–2019	ÉF Bastia	26	(0)
2020–2021	Celtix du Haut-Richelieu	23	(2)
2022	Forge FC	0	(0)
2022	Celtix du Haut-Richelieu	8	(0)
2023	Valour FC	17	(1)
- * Club domestic league appearances and goals as of 29 September 2023

Guillaume Pianelli-Balisoni (born 1 May 1998) is a French soccer player who plays as a defender.

== Early life ==
Pianelli was a product of the SC Bastia system, where he began playing at age 5, remaining there for his entire youth career, eventually training with the first team, only leaving the club when they began to experience financial difficulties.

== University career ==
In 2019, he moved to Canada to attend the Université du Québec à Trois-Rivières, where he played for the men's soccer team, winning the U Sports men's soccer championship in his first year, where he was named to the all-tournament team. Ahead of the 2022 season, he was named the team captain. Pianelli was named a U Sports First Team All-Canadian in 2022 and an RSEQ All-Star in 2019, 2021 and 2022.

== Club career ==
In 2016, he debuted with SC Bastia II in the fifth tier Championnat de France Amateur 2. He had been training with the first team at the time as well, when the club went bankrupt. He was contacted by neighbouring club AC Ajaccio, but chose to remain with Bastia, whose first team was demoted to the new fifth tier 2017–18 Championnat National 3, taking the place of the reserve side, in order to retain his status as an amateur. In 2018, he joined EF Bastia in the same division.

In 2020, he began playing for Celtix du Haut-Richelieu in the Première ligue de soccer du Québec, where he was working as a youth coach.

At the 2022 CPL–U Sports Draft, he was selected seventh overall by Forge FC, In February, he signed with Forge ahead of their CONCACAF Champions League matches, but did not remain with the club afterwards on a CPL contract as their roster was full.

He spent the 2022 season in the PLSQ with Celtix and in the 2023 pre-season, he played on the PLSQ all-star team in an exhibition match again CF Montréal.

At the 2023 CPL–U Sports Draft, he was selected in the first round (fifth overall) by Valour FC. In March 2023, he signed a U Sports contract with the club, which allows him to maintain his university eligibility.

== Career statistics ==
As of 29 September 2023

Club	Season	League			Playoffs		Domestic Cup		Continental		Total	
Club	Season	Division	Apps	Goals	Apps	Goals	Apps	Goals	Apps	Goals	Apps	Goals
SC Bastia II	2016–17	Championnat de France Amateur 2	4	0	–		–		–		4	0
SC Bastia	2017–18	Championnat National 3	0	0	–		0	0	–		0	0
ÉF Bastia	2017–18	Championnat National 3	12	0	0	0	–		–		12	0
ÉF Bastia	2018–19	Championnat National 3	14	0	–		?	?	–		14	0
ÉF Bastia	Total		26	0	0	0	0	0	0	0	26	0
Celtix du Haut-Richelieu	2020	Première ligue de soccer du Québec	8	0	–		–		–		8	0
Celtix du Haut-Richelieu	2021	Première ligue de soccer du Québec	15	2	–		–		–		15	2
Celtix du Haut-Richelieu	Total		23	2	0	0	0	0	0	0	31	2
Forge FC	2022	Canadian Premier League	0	0	0	0	0	0	0	0	0	0
Celtix du Haut-Richelieu	2022	Première ligue de soccer du Québec	8	0	–		–		–		8	0
Valour FC	2023	Canadian Premier League	17	1	–		1	0	–		18	1
Career total			78	3	1	0	0	0	0	0	79	3
