= José Maria Ribeiro da Cunha =

Portuguese footballer

José da Cunha
Personal information
- Full name: José Maria Pinto Sousa Ribeiro Cunha
- Date of birth: 27 March 2001 (age 25)
- Place of birth: Cascais, Portugal
- Height: 1.85 m (6 ft 1 in)
- Position: Defender

Team information
- Current team: Des Moines Menace

Youth career
- 2009–2011: Sporting CP
- 2011: FC Cascais
- 2012–2020: Estoril Praia

College career
Years	Team	Apps	(Gls)
2020–	CBU Capers	35	(9)

Senior career*
Years	Team	Apps	(Gls)
2020	Estoril Praia B	8	(0)
2022	Atlético Ottawa	2	(0)
2024–	Des Moines Menace	8	(1)
- * Club domestic league appearances and goals as of 8 July 2024

José Maria Pinto Sousa Ribeiro Cunha (born 27 March 2001), known as José Cunha, José da Cunha, or Zé Maria, is a Portuguese footballer who plays as a defender for the Des Moines Menace in USL League Two.

== Early life ==
Cunha began playing at age three. He joined the famed Sporting CP Youth Academy, before moving on to the youth system of G.D. Estoril Praia, where he captained the U17 and U19 teams. He briefly played for Union FC in Bradford, Ontario in 2018 during their 2018 NCAA March Break Tour, where they played against NCAA college teams Akron, Maryland, and Georgetown.

== University career ==
Cunha had initially attended the Universidade NOVA de Lisboa in Portugal, while playing in the top division U19 division in Portugal, but decided to send game tapes to universities in Canada and the United States. He made the decision to come to North America, as he wanted to pursue education and football simultaneously, which was not really viable to do in Portugal. Cape Breton University in Sydney, Nova Scotia, Canada became interested in him and he decided to attend there and play for their Capers soccer team beginning in the 2020-21 year. However, he was unable to make his debut for the Capers due to the season being cancelled due to the COVID-19 pandemic. He made his debut on 11 September 2021 against the Saint Mary's Huskies. He scored his first goal on 23 October against the Mount Allison Mounties, scoring the first goal in a 10-0 victory. In 2021, he was named the AUS Rookie of the Year and was named an AUS First-team All-Star, was named to the national U Sports All-Rookie Team, during the Capers' AUS Championship winning season, progressing to the National Championships where they won the bronze medal. In 2023, he was again named an AUS First Team All-Star.

== Club career ==
In 2020, Cunha began playing for Estoril Praia's B team in the district league, fifth tier.

At the 2021 CPL-U Sports Draft, he was selected ninth overall by Forge FC of the Canadian Premier League, but did not ultimately sign with them for the 2021 season.

At the 2022 CPL-U Sports Draft, he was selected first overall by Atlético Ottawa, with the pick being announced by Atlético Madrid and Portugal national team player João Félix. On April 1, he signed a Canadian Premier League developmental contract with Atlético Ottawa. He made his professional debut on 24 April against Valour FC. He left the club in early August to return to university, as part of his developmental contract.

== Honours ==
Atlético Ottawa

- Canadian Premier League Regular season title: 2022

== Career statistics ==
As of 8 May 2024

Club	Season	League			Playoffs		National Cup		Other		Total	
Club	Season	Division	Apps	Goals	Apps	Goals	Apps	Goals	Apps	Goals	Apps	Goals
Estoril Praia B	2020-21	AF Lisboa 2ª Divisão	8	0	—		1 (Note: Appearances in the AF Lisboa Taça)	0	0	0	9	0
Atlético Ottawa	2022	Canadian Premier League	2	0	0	0	0	0	—		2	0
Des Moines Menace	2024	USL League Two	8	1	0	0	0	0	—		8	1
Career total			18	1	0	0	1	0	0	0	19	1
