= Noah Jensen =

Canadian soccer player (born 1999)

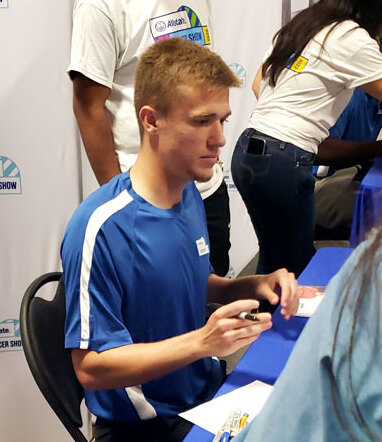
- Jensen in 2022

Personal information
- Full name: Noah Christoffer Jensen
- Date of birth: July 20, 1999 (age 27)
- Place of birth: Courtice, Ontario, Canada
- Height: 5 ft 9 in (1.75 m)
- Position: Midfielder

Team information
- Current team: Forge FC
- Number: 22

Youth career
- Islington Rangers
- Sigma FC

College career
Years	Team	Apps	(Gls)
2017–2021	Oakland Golden Grizzlies	80	(17)

Senior career*
Years	Team	Apps	(Gls)
2016–2019	Sigma FC	26	(1)
2021	Flint City Bucks	14	(2)
2022–	Forge FC	115	(15)
- * Club domestic league appearances and goals as of October 25, 2026

Noah Christoffer Jensen (born July 20, 1999) is a Canadian professional soccer player who plays for Forge FC in the Canadian Premier League.

== College career ==
Jensen played five seasons of NCAA soccer with the Oakland Golden Grizzlies. He assisted the winning goal in his first regular season game on August 25, 2017, and went on to be named to the Horizon League All-Freshman Team. He scored his first goal for Oakland in his sophomore season on September 2, 2018, on a penalty against the Loyola Ramblers. In 2018, he was named a Horizon League All-Academic Team. In 2019, he was named team captain and named to the All-Horizon League Second Team and United Soccer Coaches NCAA Division I Men's Scholar All-North/Central Region First Team. In his fourth season 2020–21, he was named 2021 Horizon League Player of the Year, an All-Horizon League first team selection, a second team All-American and was a finalist for the MAC Hermann Trophy, while leading all players in the nation in assists with 14. In his final year, he helped the Golden Grizzlies win the Horizon League regular season and conference tournament championships and was awarded the tournament's most valuable player award. He was also named an All-Horizon League first team selection for the second consecutive year. He also won the 2021 Senior CLASS Award.

== Club career ==
From 2016 to 2019, he played in League1 Ontario with Sigma FC. He scored his first goal on May 18, 2019, against Master's FA.

In 2021, he joined the Flint City Bucks in USL League Two. He scored his first goal on June 29, scoring the winning goal in the 90th minute in a 2–1 victory over the South Bend Lions. In the final regular season match of the season on July 10, Jensen recorded four assists in a 4–0 victory over Oakland County FC.

In February 2022, he signed with Forge FC of the Canadian Premier League. He made his debut on February 24 in a CONCACAF Champions League match against Mexican side Cruz Azul at Estadio Azteca. On May 14, he scored his first goal for the club, scoring the equalizer from 30 yards out, in a 1–1 draw with Atlético Ottawa. In 2022, he won the CPL Championship with Forge. On April 18, 2023, he scored a brace to lead Forge to a 3–0 victory over FC Laval, in the first round of the 2023 Canadian Championship. In October 2023, he helped Forge win their fourth league title, following a 2–1 win over Cavalry FC in the play-off final. On August 30, 2024, he scored a brace in a 2–0 victory over Pacific FC.

== International career ==
In December 2022, Jensen was called up to a camp with the Canada national futsal team.

== Career statistics ==
As of match played November 3, 2025

Club	Season	League			Playoffs		National Cup		Continental		Total	
Club	Season	Division	Apps	Goals	Apps	Goals	Apps	Goals	Apps	Goals	Apps	Goals
Sigma FC	2016	League1 Ontario	7	0	—		—		—		7	0
Sigma FC	2017	League1 Ontario	2	0	—		—		—		2	0
Sigma FC	2018	League1 Ontario	3	0	0	0	—		—		3	0
Sigma FC	2019	League1 Ontario	14	1	0	0	—		—		14	1
Sigma FC	Total		26	1	0	0	—		—		26	1
Flint City Bucks	2021	USL League Two	14	2	1	0	—		—		15	2
Forge FC	2022	Canadian Premier League	22	3	1	0	2	0	1	0	26	3
Forge FC	2023	Canadian Premier League	21	1	2	0	3	2	—		26	3
Forge FC	2024	Canadian Premier League	25	6	3	0	4	0	2	0	34	6
Forge FC	2025	Canadian Premier League	24	2	1	0	3	0	2	0	30	2
Forge FC	Total		92	12	7	0	12	2	5	0	116	14
Career total			132	15	8	0	12	2	4	0	157	17

== Honours ==
Forge FC

- Canadian Premier League: 2022, 2023
- CPL Shield: 2024, 2025
- Canadian Championship: 2026
