= Vladimir Moragrega =

Mexican footballer (born 1998)

Personal information
- Full name: Vladimir Moragrega Soto
- Date of birth: 26 July 1998 (age 28)
- Place of birth: Ahome, Sinaloa, Mexico
- Height: 1.87 m (6 ft 2 in)
- Position: Forward

Team information
- Current team: Tapatío
- Number: 49

Youth career
- 2015–2016: Sinaloa
- 2016–2017: Tijuana

Senior career*
Years	Team	Apps	(Gls)
2017–2018	Tijuana Premier	47	(20)
2018–2019	Oaxaca	6	(0)
2019	Sinaloa	0	(0)
2020	Murciélagos	5	(2)
2020–2021	Atlante	38	(7)
2021–2023	Atlético San Luis	0	(0)
2022	→ Atlético Ottawa (loan)	23	(1)
2023	→ Atlético La Paz (loan)	14	(1)
2023–2024	Correcaminos	27	(9)
2024–2025	Atlante	31	(19)
2025–	Tapatío	36	(23)
- * Club domestic league appearances and goals as of 31 October 2026

Vladimir Moragrega Soto (born 26 July 1998) is a Mexican professional footballer who plays as a forward for Liga de Expansión MX club Tapatío.

== Club career ==
=== Atlético San Luis ===
In summer 2021, Moragrega signed with Liga MX side Atlético San Luis. On 22 February 2022, he went on a season-long loan with Canadian Premier League side Atlético Ottawa, a fellow Atlético Madrid-owned club. In December 2022, he joined Atlético La Paz for 2023.

== Career statistics ==
As of match played on 31 October 2026

Club statistics
Club	Season	League			Cup		Continental		Other		Total	
Club	Season	Division	Apps	Goals	Apps	Goals	Apps	Goals	Apps	Goals	Apps	Goals
Tijuana Premier	2016–17	Liga Premier de Ascenso	14	9	—		—		—		14	9
Tijuana Premier	2017–18	Serie A de México	33	11	—		—		—		33	11
Tijuana Premier	Total		47	20	—		—		—		47	20
Oaxaca	2018–19	Ascenso MX	6	0	8	1	—		—		14	1
Sinaloa	2019–20	Ascenso MX	—		1	0	—		—		1	0
Murciélagos	2020–21	Serie A de México	5	2	—		—		—		5	2
Atlante	2020–21	Liga de Expansión MX	38	7	—		—		—		38	7
Atlético Ottawa (loan)	2022	Canadian Premier League	23	1	1	0	—		—		24	1
Atlético La Paz (loan)	2022–23	Liga de Expansión MX	14	1	—		—		—		14	1
Correcaminos	2023–24	Liga de Expansión MX	27	9	—		—		—		27	9
Atlante	2024–25	Liga de Expansión MX	31	19	—		—		—		31	19
Tapatío	2025–26	Liga de Expansión MX	26	16	—		—		—		26	16
Tapatío	2026–27	Liga de Expansión MX	10	7	—		—		—		10	7
Tapatío	Total		36	23	—		—		—		36	23
Career total			227	82	10	1	0	0	0	0	237	83

== Honours ==
=== Atlético Ottawa ===
- Canadian Premier League
  - Regular Season: 2022
