= 2022 CPL–U Sports Draft =

Fourth annual Canadian Premier League sports draft

General information
- Sport: Soccer
- Date: January 20, 2022
- Time: 8:00 PM ET
- Networks: OneSoccer, CBC Gem, Twitter, YouTube, Facebook, canpl.ca

Overview
- 16 total selections in 2 rounds
- League: Canadian Premier League
- Teams: 8
- First selection: José Cunha, Atlético Ottawa

The 2022 CPL–U Sports Draft was the fourth annual CPL–U Sports Draft. Eight Canadian Premier League (CPL) teams selected 16 eligible U Sports soccer players in total, when the draft was held on January 20, 2022.

== Format ==
Players can be selected if they have one to four years of U Sports eligibility remaining and have declared for the draft by December 1, 2021. On January 13, 2022, the league announced the list of 165 players who would be eligible for selection.

Each CPL team made two selections in the draft. The selection order is the reverse of the previous season's standings, including playoffs and final standings.

== Player selection ==
^{*}	Denotes player who has signed a professional contract for the 2022 season
^{^}	Denotes player who has signed a developmental contract for the 2022 season

=== Round 1 ===
Pick #	CPL team	Player	Position	Nationality	University	Last team/academy
1	Atlético Ottawa	José Cunha^	DF/LM	Portugal	Cape Breton	(Portugal) G.D. Estoril Praia B
2	FC Edmonton	Kairo Coore^	FW	Canada	Cape Breton	
3	HFX Wanderers FC	Christopher Campoli	MF	Canada	Ontario Tech	Unionville Milliken SC (L1O)
4	Valour FC	Raine Lyn	MF	Canada	Cape Breton	
5	York United FC	Christian Rossi	MF	Canada	Trinity Western	
6	Cavalry FC	Caden Rogozinski	DF	Canada	Mount Royal	Calgary Foothills (USL2)
7	Forge FC	Guillaume Pianelli (Note: Forge FC announced that Pianelli was added to their roster in February 2022 before the club's first match in the 2022 CONCACAF Champions League. However, he was ultimately not included in the club's roster for the 2022 Canadian Premier League season.)	DF	France	UQTR	Celtix du Haut-Richelieu (PLSQ)
8	Pacific FC	Luca Ricci	MF	Canada	Montréal	FC Lanaudière (PLSQ)

=== Round 2 ===
Pick #	CPL team	Player	Position	Nationality	University	Last team/academy
9	Atlético Ottawa	Julien Bruce	FW	France	Montréal	FC Laval (PLSQ)
10	FC Edmonton	Quentin Paumier	FW	France	Montréal	(France) FC Côte Bleue
11	HFX Wanderers FC	Colin Gander^	DF	Canada	Guelph	Guelph United (L1O)
12	Valour FC	Jacob Carlos^	MF	Canada	Ryerson	Toronto FC Academy
13	York United FC	Soji Olatoye	FW	Canada	York	Sigma FC (L1O)
14	Cavalry FC	Markus Kaiser^	MF	Canada	British Columbia	Calgary Foothills (USL2)
15	Forge FC	Mohamed Alshakman	MF	Canada	McMaster	Sigma FC (L1O)
16	Pacific FC	Rees Goertzen	DF	Canada	Victoria	Victoria Highlanders

== Selection statistics ==
=== Draftees by nationality ===
Rank	Country	Selections
1	Canada	12
2	France	3
3	Portugal	1

=== Draftees by university ===
Rank	University	Selections
1	Cape Breton	3
1	Montréal	3
3	10 universities	1
