= Rezart Rama =

Greek-Albanian footballer (born 2000)

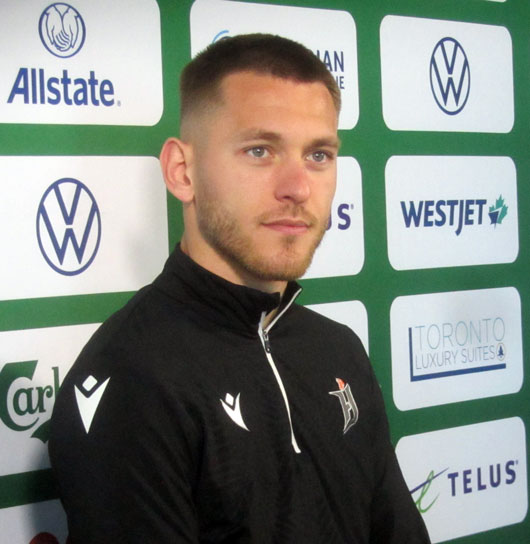
- Rama in 2025

Personal information
- Date of birth: 4 December 2000 (age 25)
- Place of birth: Athens, Greece
- Height: 1.85 m (6 ft 1 in)
- Positions: Centre-back; right-back

Team information
- Current team: Forge FC
- Number: 24

Youth career
- 2010–2019: Olympiacos
- 2019–2021: Nottingham Forest

Senior career*
Years	Team	Apps	(Gls)
2021–2022	Nottingham Forest	0	(0)
2021	→ Truro City (loan)	1	(0)
2022–2023	Forge FC	45	(1)
2024	Egnatia	18	(0)
2025–	Forge FC	49	(1)

International career^{‡}
2015–2016	Albania U17	6	(0)
2017–2018	Albania U19	5	(0)
- * Club domestic league appearances and goals as of 25 October 2026 ‡ National team caps and goals as of 20 May 2022

Rezart Rama (born 4 December 2000) is a professional footballer who plays as a centre-back for Canadian club Forge FC. Born in Greece, he has represented Albania at youth international levels.

== Early life ==
Rama was born in Athens, Greece, and grew up in neighbouring Piraeus. He developed in the academy of Olympiacos from 2010 to 2019. where he scored two goals in 23 appearances for the Olympiacos U19 in 2018–19.

== Club career ==
=== Nottingham Forest ===
In 2019, Rama joined the Nottingham Forest youth system, featuring extensively with the U19 team in 2019, before moving up to the U23 team in the Premier League 2. He made his first team debut for Nottingham Forest in a 2021 pre-season friendly on 10 July against Alfreton Town. In September 2021, he went on loan to Southern Premier League South side Truro City. After returning to Forest that season, he went on to make fifteen appearances in Premier League 2, before being released.

=== First spell at Forge FC ===
On 19 May 2022, Rama signed with Canadian Premier League side Forge FC. He made his professional debut as a starter the following day in a 4–0 win over HFX Wanderers.

On 23 September 2023, he scored his first goal for the club in a 3–1 victory over Pacific FC. In October of the same year, he helped Forge win their fourth league title, following a 2–1 win over Cavalry FC in the play-off final.

=== Egnatia ===
On 17 January 2024, Rama joined Albanian side Egnatia on a free transfer, signing a two-year-and-a-half contract with the club.

=== Second spell at Forge FC ===
On 28 January 2025, Rama returned to Canada, signing a multi-year contract with Forge FC.

== International career ==
Rama played for the Albanian U17 team in 2015 and 2016 and the U19 team in 2017 and 2018. He also served as captain of both teams.

== Career statistics ==
As of 3 November 2025

Club statistics
Club	Season	League			Playoffs		Domestic Cup		League Cup		Continental		Total	
Club	Season	Division	Apps	Goals	Apps	Goals	Apps	Goals	Apps	Goals	Apps	Goals	Apps	Goals
Nottingham Forest	2021–22	EFL Championship	0	0	—		0	0	0	0	—		0	0
Truro City (loan)	2021–22	Southern Football League	6	0	—		1	0	—		—		7	0
Forge FC	2022	Canadian Premier League	19	0	3	0	2 (Note: Includes appearance(s) in both the 2020 Canadian Championship, which was held in 2022, and the 2022 Canadian Championship)	0	—		0	0	24	0
Forge FC	2023	Canadian Premier League	26	1	2	0	2	0	—		—		30	1
Forge FC	Total		45	1	5	0	4	0	0	0	0	0	54	1
Egnatia	2023–24	Kategoria Superiore	11	0	—		2	0	—		1	0	14	0
Egnatia	2024–25	Kategoria Superiore	7	0	—		0	0	1	0	1	0	9	0
Egnatia	Total		18	0	0	0	2	0	1	0	2	0	23	0
Forge FC	2025	Canadian Premier League	25	1	2	0	5	0	—		2	0	34	1
Career total			89	2	7	0	11	0	1	0	4	0	112	2

== Honours ==
Forge FC

- Canadian Premier League: 2022, 2023
- CPL Shield: 2025
- Canadian Championship: 2026

Egnatia

- Kategoria Superiore: 2023–24
- Albanian Cup: 2023–24
- Albanian Supercup: 2024
