= Diego Espejo =

Spanish footballer (born 2002)

Personal information
- Full name: Diego Espejo de la Concepción
- Date of birth: 18 August 2002 (age 24)
- Place of birth: San Cristóbal de La Laguna, Spain
- Height: 1.88 m (6 ft 2 in)
- Position: Defender

Youth career
- Tenerife
- 2016–2022: Atlético Madrid

Senior career*
Years	Team	Apps	(Gls)
2022–2024	Atlético Madrid B	0	(0)
2022–2023	→ Atlético Ottawa (loan)	49	(2)
2024	→ Orihuela (loan)	13	(3)
2024–2026	Osasuna B	59	(5)

International career^{‡}
2018	Spain U17	2	(0)
- * Club domestic league appearances and goals as of 23 May 2026 ‡ National team caps and goals as of 18 April 2022

Diego Espejo de la Concepción (born 18 August 2002) is a Spanish footballer currently playing as a defender.

== Early life ==
Born in Santa Cruz de Tenerife, Espejo began playing youth football with local teams in Tranvía and Chincanayro. his youth career with Tenerife. In 2016, he joined the Atlético Madrid youth system. In 2019, he scored a notable bicycle kick goal in a youth match against Leganés.

== Club career ==
In July 2021, he joined Atlético Madrid B in the Tercera División RFEF, where he made a few bench appearances, but did not appear in a match.

In February 2022, he signed a contract extension with Atlético Madrid through, prior to being loaned out to their affiliate club, Atlético Ottawa in the Canadian Premier League for the 2022 season. In 2022, he led the league in headed clearances with 80 and finished second in total clearances with 114. After the season, his loan was extended for another year, with it also being announced that he would trial with Major League Soccer club Inter Miami CF in January, before joining Ottawa for pre-season. Espejo returned to Atlético Madrid B after his season-long loan expired in November 2023.

In January 2024, Espejo was loaned to Segunda Federación club Orihuela for the remainder of the season. On 4 February 2024, he scored a brace in a 2-1 victory over El Palo.

In August 2024, Espejo joined Osasuna B in the Primera Federación through June 2026, with an option to extend for an additional two seasons.

== International career ==
In 2016, he was named to the Canary Islands regional U16 team. In 2018, he was called up to the Spain U17 team, where he earned two caps.

== Honours ==
Atlético Ottawa

  - Canadian Premier League Regular season: 2022

== Career statistics ==
As of 1 June 2024

Club	Season	League			Playoffs		Domestic Cup		Other		Total	
Club	Season	Division	Apps	Goals	Apps	Goals	Apps	Goals	Apps	Goals	Apps	Goals
Atlético Madrid B	2021–22	Tercera División RFEF	0	0	–		–		–		0	0
Atlético Ottawa (loan)	2022	Canadian Premier League	25	0	2 (Note: Appearance(s) in the CPL playoffs)	0	1	0	–		28	0
Atlético Ottawa (loan)	2023	Canadian Premier League	19	1	–		2	1	–		21	2
Atlético Ottawa (loan)	Total		44	1	2	0	3	1	0	0	49	2
Orihuela (loan)	2023–24	Segunda Federación	13	3	–		0	0	4 (Note: Appearance(s) in the Segunda Federación promotion playoffs)	0	17	3
Career total			57	4	2	0	3	1	4	0	66	5
