= Ollie Bassett =

Northern Irish footballer (born 1998)

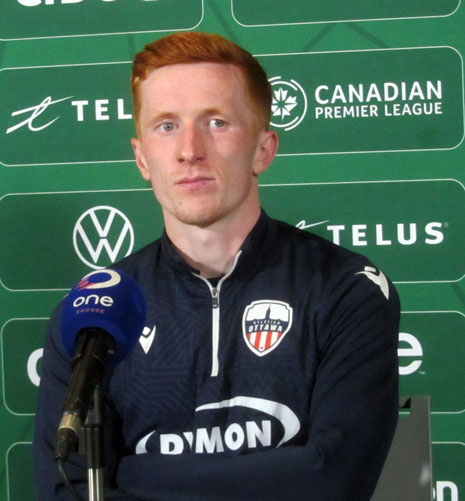
- Bassett with Atlético Ottawa in 2024

Personal information
- Full name: Oliver Jacob Bassett
- Date of birth: 6 March 1998 (age 28)
- Place of birth: Packington, England
- Height: 1.73 m (5 ft 8 in)
- Position: Attacking midfielder

Team information
- Current team: Inter Toronto FC

Youth career
- –2014: Aston Villa
- 2014–2015: Southampton
- 2015: Yeovil Town

Senior career*
Years	Team	Apps	(Gls)
2015–2017	Yeovil Town	2	(0)
2016–2017	→ Dorchester Town (loan)	18	(3)
2017–2018	Coalville Town	13	(0)
2017–2018	→ Gresley (loan)	15	(4)
2018–2019	Waitakere United	18	(4)
2019–2020	Team Wellington	10	(6)
2020	St Albans Saints	5	(2)
2020	Nuneaton Borough	4	(1)
2021	Pacific FC	20	(2)
2022–2024	Atlético Ottawa	81	(22)
2025	Tampa Bay Rowdies	19	(1)
2026–	Inter Toronto FC	27	(1)

International career^{‡}
2016	Northern Ireland U19	1	(0)
- * Club domestic league appearances and goals as of 31 October 2026 ‡ National team caps and goals as of 11:33, 6 October 2016 (UTC)

Oliver Jacob Bassett (born 6 March 1998) is a professional football player who plays as an attacking midfielder for Inter Toronto FC in the Canadian Premier League. Born in England, he represented Northern Ireland at youth level.

== Club career ==
=== Early career ===
Born in Packington, Leicestershire, Bassett started his football career as a youngster in the Aston Villa Academy and as a teenager played futsal before signing a scholarship at Southampton in the summer of 2014.

=== Yeovil Town ===
On 19 September 2015, Bassett made his Football League debut for Yeovil Town in a 1–0 victory against Crawley Town, at the age of just 17 years, 6 months and 13 days he broke the record for the youngest Yeovil player in the Football League. On 3 December 2015, Bassett was awarded his first professional contract with Yeovil Town, committing him to the club until June 2017.

On 13 September 2016, Bassett joined Southern League Premier Division side Dorchester Town on an initial one-month loan deal. Bassett made his debut the following day as a second-half substitute in Dorchester's 4–0 victory against Frome Town, with Bassett providing the assist for the fourth goal. Having made four appearances in his first loan spell with Dorchester, Bassett returned on loan to the Southern League club on 28 October 2016.

On 3 February 2017, Bassett joined Dorchester for a third loan spell.

At the end of the 2016–17 season, Bassett was released by Yeovil having only made two appearances for the club.

=== Coalville Town ===
On 9 August 2017, Bassett signed for Northern Premier League Premier Division club Coalville Town on a one-year contract.

=== Waitakere United ===
Following his release from Coalville, Bassett secured a contract with New Zealand Football Championship side Waitakere United.

=== Pacific FC ===
Following a stint with Nuneaton Borough, Bassett signed with Canadian Premier League side Pacific FC on 29 April 2021. In his season with the Tridents, Bassett contributed with 2 goals and 3 assists as Pacific won the league. After a strong start to the season, Bassett started to see his minutes decrease as the season progressed, and did not play a single minute in the playoffs. Despite interest from the club to trigger his club option for next season, Bassett preferred to move on and find an opportunity to play more regular minutes elsewhere. In January 2022, Pacific confirmed that Bassett had left the club.

=== Atlético Ottawa ===
In January 2022, Bassett switched to Canadian Premier League side Atlético Ottawa signing a two-year contract with an option for a third year. On Jun 9, 2022, capping off a hot start to the season, Bassett was named the CPL's Player of the Month for the month of May 2022. Bassett played a crucial role for Ottawa, and led to the team to finish as regular season champions, but they ultimately lost in the final to Forge FC. On October 28, 2022, he was awarded the CPL's Player of the Year and Player's Player of the Year awards. In 2023, Bassett, along with Cavalry's Myer Bevan, led the league in scoring with 11 goals. After the 2024 season, he announced his departure from the club.

=== Tampa Bay Rowdies ===
On 27 November 2024, the Tampa Bay Rowdies announced that they had signed Bassett as their first new player ahead of the 2025 season.

=== Inter Toronto FC ===
In November 2025, Bassett returned to the Canadian Premier League, signing with Inter Toronto FC for the 2026 season.

== International career ==
In August 2016, Bassett was called up to the Northern Ireland under-19 side for a training camp. Bassett did enough to impress the Northern Ireland coaching staff to receive a call-up for their 2017 UEFA European Under-19 Championship qualification matches in October 2016. On 6 October 2016, Bassett made his debut for Northern Ireland under-19s against Slovakia in a 1–0 defeat.

== Career statistics ==
As of match played 17 August 2025

Appearances and goals by club, season and competition
Club	Season	League			National Cup (Note: Includes FA Cup and Canadian Championship)		League Cup		Other		Total	
Club	Season	Division	Apps	Goals	Apps	Goals	Apps	Goals	Apps	Goals	Apps	Goals
Yeovil Town	2015–16	League Two	2	0	0	0	0	0	0	0	2	0
Yeovil Town	2016–17	League Two	0	0	0	0	0	0	0	0	0	0
Yeovil Town	Total		2	0	0	0	0	0	0	0	2	0
Dorchester Town (loan)	2016–17	Southern League Premier Division	18	3	0	0	—		3 (Note: Two appearances and one goal in FA Trophy, one appearance in Dorset Senior Cup)	1	21	4
Coalville Town	2017–18	NPL Premier Division	13	0	1	0	—		3 (Note: One appearance in FA Trophy, one appearance in Northern Premier League Challenge Cup, one appearance in Leicestershire and Rutland Senior Cup)	0	17	0
Gresley (loan)	2017–18	NPL Division One South	15	4	—		—		1 (Note: Appearance in Derbyshire Senior Cup)	0	16	4
Waitakere United	2018–19	New Zealand Football Championship	18	4	—		—		—		18	4
Team Wellington	2019–20	New Zealand Football Championship	10	6	—		—		—		10	6
St Albans Saints	2020	National Premier Leagues Victoria	5	2	—		—		—		5	2
Nuneaton Borough	2020–21	Southern League Premier Division Central	4	1	2	1	—		2 (Note: Appearances in FA Trophy)	0	8	2
Pacific FC	2021	Canadian Premier League	20	2	0	0	—		0	0	20	2
Atlético Ottawa	2022	Canadian Premier League	27	8	1	0	—		3 (Note: Appearances in Canadian Premier League playoffs)	0	31	8
Atlético Ottawa	2023	Canadian Premier League	27	11	2	1	—		—		29	12
Atlético Ottawa	2024	Canadian Premier League	27	3	3	2	—		2	1	32	6
Atlético Ottawa	Total		81	22	6	3	—		5	1	92	26
Tampa Bay Rowdies	2025	USL Championship	19	1	2	0	—		4 (Note: Appearances in USL Cup)	1	25	2
Inter Toronto FC	2026	Canadian Premier League	0	0	0	0	—		0	0	0	0
Career total			205	45	11	4	0	0	18	3	234	52

== Honours ==
Pacific FC

- Canadian Premier League: 2021

Atlético Ottawa

- Canadian Premier League
  - Regular Season: 2022
  - CCSG Golden Scarf: 2022
  - Player of the Year Award: 2022
  - Player's Player of the Year Award: 2022
  - Golden Boot: 2023
