= Abdoul Sissoko =

French footballer (born 1990)

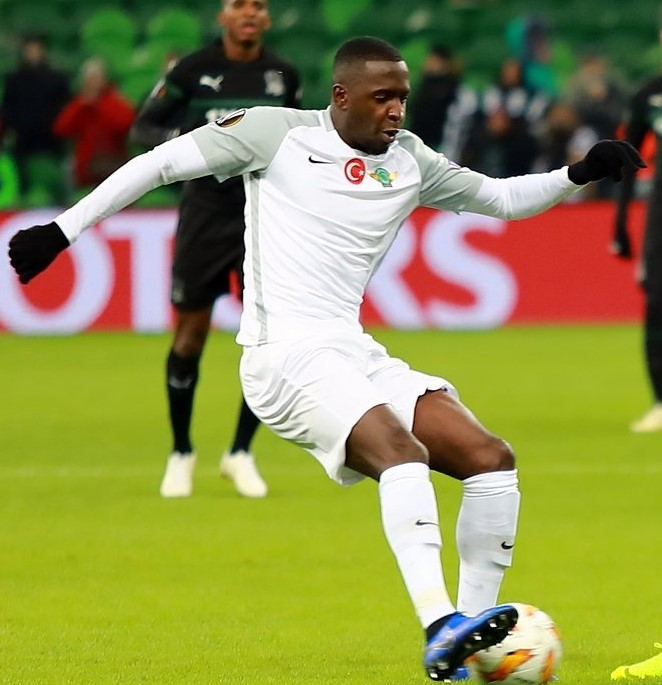
- Sissoko with Akhisarspor in 2018

Personal information
- Full name: Abdoul Wahid Sissoko
- Date of birth: 20 March 1990 (age 36)
- Place of birth: Troyes, France
- Height: 1.80 m (5 ft 11 in)
- Positions: Midfielder; centre-back

Team information
- Current team: Qadsia

Youth career
- Troyes

Senior career*
Years	Team	Apps	(Gls)
2008–2011	Troyes	55	(0)
2011–2015	Udinese	10	(0)
2012–2013	→ Brest (loan)	47	(0)
2013–2014	→ Hércules (loan)	29	(3)
2014–2015	→ Granada (loan)	11	(0)
2015–2016	Mallorca	34	(3)
2016–2019	Akhisarspor	82	(2)
2019–2021	Kuwait SC	26	(3)
2022	Atlético Ottawa	25	(0)
2023	Qadsia	6	(0)

International career^{‡}
2011	France U20	4	(0)
- * Club domestic league appearances and goals as of 17 October 2022 ‡ National team caps and goals as of 19:51, 19 May 2014 (UTC)

Abdoul Wahid Sissoko (born 20 March 1990) is a French professional footballer who plays as a midfielder for Qadsia in the Kuwait Premier League.

== Career ==
Born in Troyes, Sissoko began his career with hometown's Troyes. He made his professional debut on 15 August 2008, against Brest for the Ligue 2 championship. Sissoko featured sparingly in his first two campaigns, but was a starter in his third, appearing in 26 matches as his side narrowly avoided relegation.

On 1 July 2011, Sissoko signed a five-year deal for Udinese. On 19 January of the following year, he was loaned to Brest, after only appearing in a Coppa Italia match against Chievo Verona earlier in the month.

On 5 July 2012, Sissoko's loan was renewed. On 3 September of the following year, he moved to Hércules also in a temporary deal.

Sissoko scored his first professional goal on 9 November 2013, netting the winner of a 2–1 home success against Las Palmas. He featured in 29 matches and scored three goals, as the Valencian side were relegated.

On 17 July 2014, Sissoko joined La Liga side Granada in a season-long loan. He made his debut in the competition on 23 August, starting in a 2–1 home win against Deportivo de La Coruña.

On 4 September 2015, free agent Sissoko signed a one-year deal with Mallorca in Segunda División.

On 10 May 2018, Sissoko helped Akhisarspor win their first professional trophy, the 2017–18 Turkish Cup and scored a goal in the final.

On 10 March 2022, Sissoko signed a one-year contract with an option for a further year with Canadian Premier League side Atletico Ottawa, rejoining former Kuwait SC manager Carlos González. He departed the club following the 2022 season.

In January 2023, he signed with Kuwait Premier League club Qadsia.

== Personal life ==
Sissoko's older brother, Mohamed, is also a footballer. He is the nephew of footballer Salif Keïta and also cousin to Oumar Sissoko and Seydou Keita.

== Honours ==
Akhisarspor

- Turkish Cup: 2017–18
- Turkish Super Cup: 2018

Atlético Ottawa

- Canadian Premier League Regular Season: 2022
