= Sean Melvin =

Canadian soccer player (born 1994)

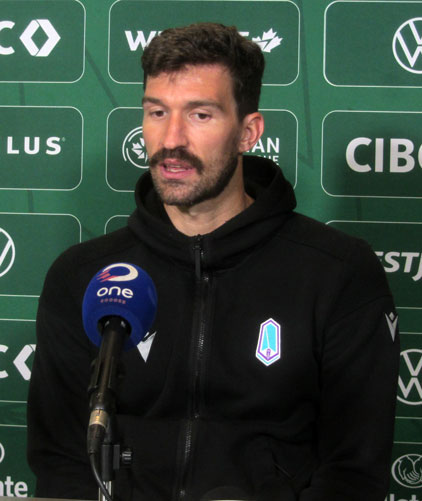
- Melvin in 2024

Personal information
- Full name: Sean Ross Melvin
- Date of birth: July 9, 1994 (age 32)
- Place of birth: Victoria, British Columbia, Canada
- Height: 1.93 m (6 ft 4 in)
- Position: Goalkeeper

Team information
- Current team: Pacific FC

Youth career
- Gordon Head SA
- 2007–2010: Victoria United Metro
- 2010–2013: Vancouver Whitecaps FC

College career
Years	Team	Apps	(Gls)
2013–2015	UNC Wilmington Seahawks	43	(0)

Senior career*
Years	Team	Apps	(Gls)
2013	Vancouver Whitecaps FC U-23	7	(0)
2015	Calgary Foothills	7	(0)
2016–2017	Whitecaps FC 2	21	(0)
2017	→ Vancouver Whitecaps FC (loan)	0	(0)
2018	Fresno FC	0	(0)
2018–2019	Vancouver Whitecaps FC	0	(0)
2020–2021	Colorado Springs Switchbacks	35	(0)
2022–2023	Atlético Ottawa	10	(0)
2024–	Pacific FC	38	(0)

International career
2017	Canada	1	(0)
- * Club domestic league appearances and goals as of October 25, 2026

Sean Ross Melvin (born July 9, 1994) is a Canadian professional soccer player who plays as a goalkeeper for Pacific FC in the Canadian Premier League.

== Early life ==
Melvin was born and raised in Victoria, British Columbia to parents from Vancouver. At the age of five, he began playing soccer with Gordon Head SA.

Melvin played for three seasons with the UNC Wilmington Seahawks from 2013 to 2015. While at UNC Wilmington, Melvin played in 2013–2014 with the Vancouver Whitecaps FC U-23 side in the Premier Development League, starting a total of seven games. In 2015, Melvin was loaned to Calgary Foothills FC in the USL PDL, where he became the No. 1 starter until returning to UNC Wilmington for their 2015 season.

== Club career ==
=== Whitecaps FC 2 ===
Melvin signed his first professional contract with Whitecaps FC 2 of the United Soccer League in February 2016. In the 2016 season, Melvin shared the net with fellow WFC 2 keepers Marco Carducci and Spencer Richey. In December 2016, Whitecaps FC 2 announced that Melvin would return to the club for the 2017 season. In May 2017, Melvin was named to the Whitecaps roster for the 2017 Canadian Championship on a short-term contract. He spent two seasons with Whitecaps FC 2 before the club ceased operations after the 2017 season.

=== Fresno FC ===
In December 2017, Melvin signed a USL contract with Whitecaps affiliate Fresno FC.

=== Vancouver Whitecaps FC ===
In April 2018, Melvin signed a first team contract with Vancouver Whitecaps FC for the 2018 season, including options through the 2021 season. Melvin was released by Vancouver at the end of the 2019 season.

=== Colorado Springs Switchbacks ===
On January 6, 2020, Melvin joined USL Championship side Colorado Springs Switchbacks. Melvin would start 11 games during a shortened 2020 season, keeping 2 clean sheets. In November 2020, the club announced Melvin would return for the 2021 season.

=== Atlético Ottawa ===
On February 4, 2022, Melvin signed a one-year contract with an option for 2023 with Canadian Premier League side Atlético Ottawa. At the end of the season, Ottawa announced Melvin would have his option picked-up for 2023.

=== Pacific FC ===
In February 2024, he signed with Pacific FC on a two-year contract with an option for 2026.

== International career ==
In January 2015, Melvin received his first call up to the Canadian men's national team for a pair of friendlies against Iceland. Melvin did not see any action in the friendlies. In January 2017, Melvin received his second call up for a national team camp prior to a friendly against Bermuda. Melvin made his national team debut in the match, coming on at half time, but was injured shortly after coming on, requiring centre back Adam Straith to replace him in goal.

== Honours ==
=== Atlético Ottawa ===
- Canadian Premier League
  - Regular Season: 2022
