= Zakaria Bahous =

Canadian soccer player (born 2001)

Personal information
- Date of birth: May 8, 2001 (age 25)
- Place of birth: Longueuil, Quebec, Canada
- Height: 1.80 m (5 ft 11 in)
- Position: Midfielder

Youth career
- FC Brossard
- FC St-Léonard
- 2016–2019: CS Longueuil

College career
| Years | Team | Apps | (Gls) |
| 2019–2021 | Champlain Cavaliers | | |

Senior career*
| Years | Team | Apps | (Gls) |
| 2018–2020 | CS Longueuil | 19 | (1) |
| 2021 | FC Laval | 11 | (2) |
| 2022–2023 | Atlético Ottawa | 38 | (2) |
| 2023–2024 | Pacific FC | 19 | (1) |
| 2025– | CS St-Hubert | 9 | (3) |
- * Club domestic league appearances and goals as of October 23, 2024

Zakaria Bahous (born May 8, 2001) is a Canadian soccer player who plays as a midfielder for CS St-Hubert in Ligue1 Québec.

== Early life and college career ==
Bahous played youth soccer with FC Brossard, FC St-Léonard, and CS Longueuil.

Bahous began attending Champlain College Saint-Lambert in 2018, playing for the men's soccer team, serving as team captain by the end of his four-year career. In 2021, he led the RSEQ with ten goals in nine games, earning Canadian Collegiate Athletic Association Player of the Year honours, and being named an RSEQ D1 All-Star.

== Club career ==
He began his senior career with CS Longueuil in the Première ligue de soccer du Québec.

In 2021, he played for FC Laval in the PLSQ.

In 2022, he signed a professional contract with Canadian Premier League club Atlético Ottawa for two years, with a club option for 2024. He made his debut on April 9, against Cavalry FC. On October 1, Bahous scored his first professional goal, scoring the winning goal in a 2–1 victory over HFX Wanderers FC. In July 2023, he departed the club.

In September 2023, he joined Pacific FC of the Canadian Premier League for the remainder of the 2023 season, with a club option for 2024. In January 2024, he signed a new one-year contract with the club, with an option for 2025. The club declined his option for 2025.

== Personal ==
Bahous is of Algerian descent.

== Honours ==
Atlético Ottawa

- Canadian Premier League
  - Regular Season: 2022

== Career statistics ==
As of match played September 23, 2025

Club statistics
| Club | Season | League | | | Playoffs | | Domestic Cup | | Continental | | Total | |
| Club | Season | Division | Apps | Goals | Apps | Goals | Apps | Goals | Apps | Goals | Apps | Goals |
|---|---|---|---|---|---|---|---|---|---|---|---|---|
| CS Longueuil | 2018 | Première Ligue de soccer du Québec | 1 | 0 | — | | — | | — | | 1 | 0 |
| CS Longueuil | 2019 | Première Ligue de soccer du Québec | 11 | 1 | — | | — | | — | | 11 | 1 |
| CS Longueuil | 2020 | Première Ligue de soccer du Québec | 7 | 0 | — | | — | | — | | 7 | 0 |
| CS Longueuil | Total | | 19 | 1 | 0 | 0 | 0 | 0 | 0 | 0 | 19 | 1 |
| FC Laval | 2021 | Première Ligue de soccer du Québec | 11 | 2 | — | | — | | — | | 11 | 2 |
| Atlético Ottawa | 2022 | Canadian Premier League | 26 | 1 | 3 | 0 | 0 | 0 | — | | 29 | 1 |
| Atlético Ottawa | 2023 | Canadian Premier League | 12 | 1 | 0 | 0 | 2 | 0 | — | | 14 | 1 |
| Atlético Ottawa | Total | | 38 | 2 | 3 | 0 | 2 | 0 | 0 | 0 | 43 | 2 |
| Pacific FC | 2023 | Canadian Premier League | 4 | 0 | 2 | 0 | 0 | 0 | — | | 6 | 0 |
| Pacific FC | 2024 | Canadian Premier League | 15 | 1 | 1 | 0 | 4 | 0 | — | | 20 | 1 |
| Pacific FC | Total | | 19 | 1 | 3 | 0 | 4 | 0 | 0 | 0 | 26 | 1 |
| CS St-Hubert | 2025 | Ligue1 Québec | 9 | 3 | — | | — | | 1 | 0 | 10 | 3 |
| Career total | | | 96 | 9 | 6 | 0 | 6 | 0 | 0 | 0 | 109 | 8 |
