= Iván Pérez (footballer, born 1992) =

Spanish footballer

Personal information
- Full name: Iván Pérez Vicente
- Date of birth: 20 October 1992 (age 34)
- Place of birth: Murcia, Spain
- Height: 1.74 m (5 ft 9 in)
- Position: Left back

Team information
- Current team: Zürich City SC

Youth career
- Rayo Majadahonda

Senior career*
Years	Team	Apps	(Gls)
2011–2012	Rayo Majadahonda	2	(0)
2012–2013	La Hoya Lorca	42	(4)
2013–2016	Atlético Madrid B	58	(0)
2014	Atlético Madrid	0	(0)
2016	Getafe B	11	(0)
2016–2017	Lorca Deportiva	18	(4)
2017–2018	Yeclano	27	(12)
2018–2019	SS Reyes	27	(1)
2019–2021	Murcia	30	(1)
2021–2022	SS Reyes	18	(0)
2022	→ Atlético Ottawa (loan)	3	(0)
2022	Atlético Ottawa	5	(1)
2023	Mar Menor	16	(0)
2023–2024	Yeclano	25	(1)
2024–	Zürich City SC	7	(3)
- * Club domestic league appearances and goals as of 6 October 2024

Iván Pérez Vicente (born 20 October 1992) is a Spanish footballer who plays as a left back for Swiss 2. Liga club Zürich City SC.

== Club career ==
Born in El Palmar, Murcia, Pérez was a product of CF Rayo Majadahonda's youth setup. He made his debut as a senior in the 2011–12 campaign, in Tercera División.

In January 2012, he moved to fellow league team La Hoya Lorca CF.

In the 2013 summer he went on a trial with Atlético Madrid B, and signed a two-year contract shortly after. In June 2014, after receiving offers from La Liga sides Getafe CF and UD Almería and from Segunda División's CD Tenerife, he renewed his link with the club for a further year. On 18 December 2014 Pérez made his Atlético Madrid first team debut, starting in a 2–2 home draw against CE L'Hospitalet, for the season's Copa del Rey.

On 29 January 2016, he moved to another reserve team, Getafe CF B also in the third division.

In 2016, he signed with Tercera División club CF Lorca Deportiva and helped them earn promotion to the Segunda División B.

The following season, he remained in the Tercera División, signing with Yeclano Deportivo in September 2017.

In July 2018, he signed with SS Reyes in the Segunda División B. At the end of the season, he departed the club.

In May 2019, Pérez returned to his birth city and joined Real Murcia of the Segunda División B. He rejected other offers in order to join the club, stating that he had to listen to his heart and think of his family. He missed much of the 2020-21 season due to a recurring injury.

In June 2021, he re-joined SS Reyes.

On 11 May 2022, Pérez joined Canadian Premier League side Atlético Ottawa on a short-term loan from SS Reyes until 30 June. Following the expiration of his loan, he signed a permanent contract for the rest of the season, with an option for 2023 with Ottawa.

In December 2022, it was announced that he was returning to Spain to join Segunda Federación club Mar Menor in 2023.

In August 2023, he signed with Yeclano in the Segunda Federación.

In July 2024, he signed with Swiss club Zürich City SC in the sixth tier 2. Liga.
