= Sergio Camus =

Spanish footballer

Personal information
- Full name: Sergio Camus Perojo
- Date of birth: 19 April 1997 (age 29)
- Place of birth: Colindres, Spain
- Height: 1.76 m (5 ft 9 in)
- Position: Right-back

Youth career
- Colindres
- 2013–2015: Racing Santander

Senior career*
Years	Team	Apps	(Gls)
2015–2016	Racing B	36	(0)
2015–2017	Racing Santander	4	(0)
2017	→ Arenas Getxo (loan)	12	(0)
2017	Arenas Getxo	10	(0)
2018–2020	Vitoria	35	(0)
2020–2021	Portugalete	11	(0)
2021–2023	Atlético Madrid B	53	(0)
2022	→ Atlético Ottawa (loan)	8	(0)
2023–2024	Unionistas	26	(0)
2024–2025	Tarazona	37	(1)
2025–2026	Gimnàstic	27	(0)
- * Club domestic league appearances and goals as of 10 June 2026

Sergio Camus Perojo (born 19 April 1997) is a Spanish footballer. Mainly a right-back, he can also play as a centre-back.

== Career ==
Born in Colindres, Cantabria, Camus joined Racing de Santander's youth sides in 2013, from hometown club CD Colindres. He made his senior debut with the reserves on 10 May 2015, starting in a 2–1 Tercera División away win over AD Siete Villas.

After establishing himself as a regular starter for the B's during the 2015–16 campaign, Camus made his first team debut on 8 November 2015, coming on as a second-half substitute for fellow youth graduate Borja Docal in a 1–1 Segunda División B home draw against Burgos CF. On 19 January 2017, after failing to make a breakthrough in the main squad, he was loaned to fellow third division side Arenas Club de Getxo until June.

On 31 August 2017, Camus terminated his link with Racing and returned to Arenas on a permanent deal. The following 11 January, he moved to SD Eibar and was assigned to farm team CD Vitoria in the same category.

On 25 August 2020, Camus agreed to a deal with Club Portugalete, after spending the previous season in Tercera División after Vitoria was relegated. The following 27 January, he signed with another reserve team, Atlético Madrid B also in the third tier.

During his time with Atleti B, Camus captained the side, and trained with the first team during the 2021-22 pre-season, playing five friendly matches and scoring the winning penalty kick in a match against CD Numancia. He was also an unused substitute for the main squad in a UEFA Champions League match against AC Milan.

On 10 August 2022, Camus moved abroad for the first time in his career, joining Atlético Madrid's Canadian Premier League affiliate Atlético Ottawa on loan. He made his professional debut eleven days later, replacing Macdonald Niba late into a 3–0 away win over Cavalry FC. Camus helped Ottawa win the regular season title in 2022, featuring in 13 matches overall.

On 5 July 2023, free agent Camus signed a one-year deal with Primera Federación side Unionistas de Salamanca CF. Roughly one year later, he moved to fellow league team SD Tarazona.

On 7 July 2025, Camus agreed to a one-year contract with Gimnàstic de Tarragona also in the third tier Primera Federación, with an option for a further season.

== Honours ==
Atlético Ottawa

- Canadian Premier League: 2022 Regular Season
