= Filip Dujic =

Canadian soccer referee

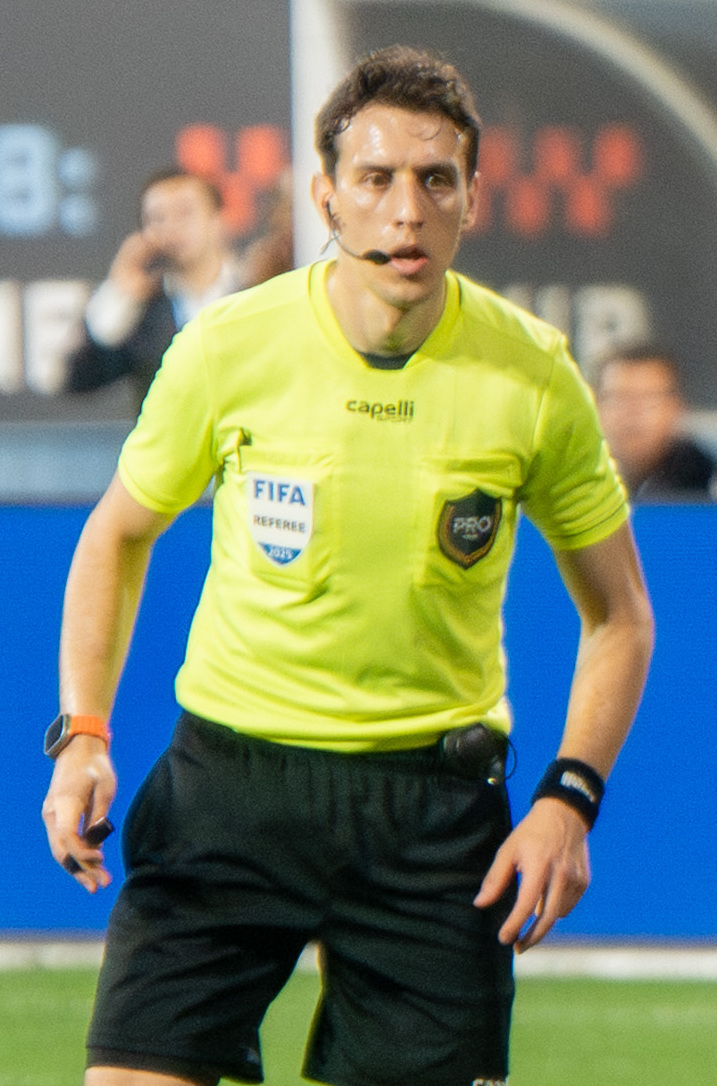
- Dujic in 2025
- Born: January 22, 1994 (age 32); Toronto, Ontario, Canada

Domestic
Years	League	Role
2016–????	League1 Ontario	Referee
2019–2022	Canadian Premier League	Referee
2022–	Major League Soccer	Referee

International
Years	League	Role
2024–	FIFA listed	Referee

Filip Dujic (Croatian: Filip Dujić, born January 22, 1994) is a Canadian soccer referee who regularly officiates Major League Soccer matches and is a FIFA-listed referee for international matches.

== Career ==
In August 2015, Dujic was selected to referee the first Professional Futsal League SuperCopa.

In November 2018, Dujic completed CONCACAF's Program of Referee Excellence and was assigned to matches at the 2018 CONCACAF U-20 Championship. In 2019, he was named to the Canadian Soccer Association List of Referees and Assistant Referees and began to referee matches in the Canadian Premier League.

In 2022, Dujic began referring in Major League Soccer. In January 2024, he was appointed as a FIFA-licensed referee for international matches.

"After review, there was no offside offense, ... However, prior to the goal, there was a foul committed by St. Louis. The final decision is direct free kick."

— Filip Dujic
June 22, 2024
VAR call announcement

On June 22, 2024, when announcing a VAR decision, Dujic created a viral moment when he stated that there was no offside on a goal, but a foul instead. The moment received attention because of Dujic's delivery of "However" between the dismissal of the offside and the ruling of the foul.
