= Carlos González (football manager) =

Spanish football manager

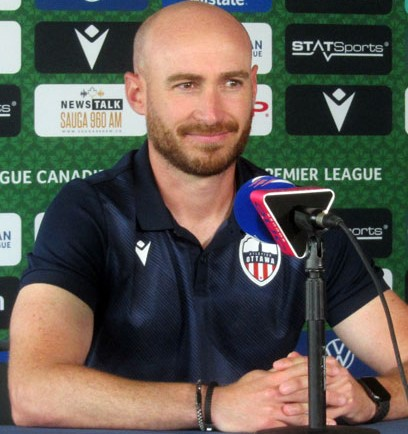
- González in 2022

Personal information
- Full name: Carlos González Juárez
- Date of birth: 7 April 1986 (age 40)
- Place of birth: Granada, Spain

Managerial career
- Years: Team
- 2012–2015: Málaga (youth)
- 2015–2020: Atlético Madrid (youth)
- 2021: Kuwait SC
- 2021: Kuwait U23
- 2021–2022: Kuwait
- 2022–2024: Atlético Ottawa

Carlos González Juárez (born 7 April 1986) is a Spanish football manager.

== Early life ==
González was born in Granada. After giving up on his career as a player, he studied sport science at Alfonso X El Sabio University and the University of Granada, which he credited with helping launch his career as a football manager.

== Managerial career ==
=== Málaga ===
In 2012, González began working as a coach at the academy of La Liga side Málaga.

=== Atlético Madrid ===
In 2015, he left Málaga to coach in Atlético Madrid's academy system. In 2018, he became manager of the under-19 team and led them to the final of the 2019 Copa del Rey Juvenil, where the team lost to Villarreal.

=== Kuwait ===
On 24 February 2021, González moved to Kuwait to sign as manager of Kuwait SC, his first position as a club first-team manager, and simultaneously as manager of the Kuwaiti national under-23 team. He left Kuwait SC in July of that year, but continued as Kuwait U23 coach at the 2022 U-23 Asian Cup qualifying tournament, guiding Kuwait to qualification for the final tournament. In November 2021, González was appointed manager of the Kuwaiti senior national team, where he coached the team in friendlies against the Czech Republic and Lithuania that month, and a pair of friendlies against Libya in early 2022.

=== Atlético Ottawa ===
On 24 February 2022, González signed as head coach of Atlético Madrid-owned Canadian Premier League side Atlético Ottawa. On October 28, 2022, after leading the club to first place in the CPL regular season, he was named CPL Coach of the Year. After the 2024 season, he and the club agreed to part ways by mutual agreement.

== Honours ==
=== Atlético Ottawa ===
- Canadian Premier League
  - Regular Season: 2022
  - CPL Coach of the Year: 2022

== Managerial statistics ==
As of May 1, 2024

Managerial record by club and tenure
| Team | From | To | Record | | | | | | | |
| Team | From | To | M | W | D | L | GF | GA | GD | Win % |
|---|---|---|---|---|---|---|---|---|---|---|
| Kuwait SC | 24 February 2021 | July 2021 | 17 | 10 | 5 | 2 | 38 | 18 | +20 | 58.82 |
| Kuwait U23 | 24 February 2021 | November 2021 | 8 | 3 | 3 | 2 | 10 | 12 | −2 | 37.50 |
| Kuwait | November 2021 | February 2022 | 4 | 1 | 1 | 2 | 3 | 10 | −7 | 25.00 |
| Atlético Ottawa | 24 February 2022 | 21 November 2024 | 65 | 28 | 17 | 20 | 94 | 71 | +23 | 43.08 |
| Total | | | 94 | 42 | 26 | 26 | 145 | 111 | +34 | 44.68 |
