= List of Canadian Premier League transfers 2022 =

This is a list of transfers for the 2022 Canadian Premier League season.

This list includes all transfers involving Canadian Premier League clubs after their last match of the 2021 Canadian Premier League season and before their last match of the 2022 season.

== Transfers ==
Clubs without flags are Canadian.

Date	Name	Moving from	Moving to	Fee
15 December 2021	(Canada) Mouhamadou Kane	CF Montréal	York United	Free
16 December 2021	(Spain) Victor Blasco	Pacific	(Honduras) Vida	Undisclosed
21 December 2021	(Canada) Diego Gutiérrez	(Chile) Barnechea	Valour	Free
5 January 2022	(Denmark) Daniel Obbekjær	(Denmark) OB	York United	Free
6 January 2022	(Brazil) Eduardo Jesus	(Brazil) Bahia	York United	Free
7 January 2022	(Czech Republic) Martin Graiciar	(Italy) Fiorentina	York United	Free
9 January 2022	(United States) Ahinga Selemani	Cavalry	(Malta) Gudja United	Free
11 January 2022	(Canada) Terran Campbell	Pacific	Forge	Free
12 January 2022	(Canada) Alessandro Hojabrpour	Pacific	Forge	Free
12 January 2022	(Canada) Easton Ongaro	FC Edmonton	(Romania) UTA Arad	Free
13 January 2022	(Chile) Walter Ponce	(Chile) Barnechea	Valour	Free
14 January 2022	(Brazil) Richard Luca	Cavalry	(Bolivia) Atlético Palmaflor	Free
18 January 2022	(Canada) Matteo de Brienne	Carleton University	Valour	Free
19 January 2022	(Syria) Molham Babouli	Forge	(Qatar) Muaither	Free
19 January 2022	(Canada) Aidan Daniels	(United States) OKC Energy	HFX Wanderers	Free
19 January 2022	(Dominican Republic) Gerard Lavergne	York United	(Dominican Republic) Atlético Pantoja	Free
21 January 2022	(United States) Jonathan Esparza	(United States) Chattanooga Red Wolves	Valour	Free
22 January 2022	(Canada) Milovan Kapor	Atlético Ottawa	(Slovakia) Pohronie	Free
25 January 2022	(Canada) Lukas MacNaughton	Pacific	Toronto FC	Undisclosed
25 January 2022	(Brazil) Oliver	Cavalry	York United	Free
26 January 2022	(Canada) Keven Alemán	Valour	Atlético Ottawa	Free
26 January 2022	(Canada) Zakaria Bahous	Champlain College Saint-Lambert	Atlético Ottawa	Free
26 January 2022	(Northern Ireland) Ollie Bassett	Pacific	Atlético Ottawa	Free
26 January 2022	(Canada) Zach Fernandez	Blainville	HFX Wanderers	Free
26 January 2022	(Canada) Nathan Ingham	York United	Atlético Ottawa	Free
26 January 2022	(Cameroon) Macdonald Niba	(Finland) KuPS	Atlético Ottawa	Free
26 January 2022	(Canada) Obeng Tabi	(United States) LSUE	HFX Wanderers	Free
26 January 2022	(Canada) Maxim Tissot	Forge	Atlético Ottawa	Free
28 January 2022	(Colombia) Daniel Ascanio	(Colombia) Real Santander	Valour	Loan
28 January 2022	(New Zealand) Myer Bevan	(New Zealand) Auckland City	Cavalry	Free
28 January 2022	(Spain) Raúl Uche	Atlético Ottawa	(Spain) Salamanca	Free
28 January 2022	(Algeria) Rayane Yesli	Blainville	Valour	Free
31 January 2022	(Canada) Matthew Durrans	FC Edmonton	(Germany) FC Pipinsried	Free
1 February 2022	(Spain) José Galán	Valour	(Gibraltar) Bruno's Magpies	Free
1 February 2022	(Canada) Ashtone Morgan	(United States) Real Salt Lake	Forge	Free
1 February 2022	(Jamaica) Tevin Shaw	Atlético Ottawa	(United States) Tucson	Free
2 February 2022	(Canada) Scott Firth	HFX Wanderers	Saint Mary's University	Free
2 February 2022	(Canada) Kwasi Poku	Toronto FC II	Forge	Free
2 February 2022	(Mali) Aboubacar Sissoko	(United States) Indy Eleven	Forge	Free
3 February 2022	(Cameroon) Jeannot Esua	FC Edmonton	(Finland) PEPO	Free
4 February 2022	(Canada) Morey Doner	HFX Wanderers	(United States) Monterey Bay	Free
4 February 2022	(Canada) Sean Melvin	(United States) Colorado Springs Switchbacks	Atlético Ottawa	Free
4 February 2022	(Canada) Rocco Romeo	Toronto FC	Valour	Free
4 February 2022	(Canada) Zachary Roy	Champlain College Saint-Lambert	Atlético Ottawa	Free
4 February 2022	(Canada) Antoine Coupland	Atlético Ottawa	(Croatia) Rijeka	Free
9 February 2022	(Canada) Fraser Aird	FC Edmonton	Cavalry	Free
9 February 2022	(Canada) Amer Đidić	FC Edmonton	Pacific	Free
9 February 2022	(Canada) Alessandro Riggi	HFX Wanderers	Valour	Free
10 February 2022	(Canada) Paul Amedume	Pacific	(United States) North Texas SC	Loan
10 February 2022	(Canada) Carl Haworth	(United States) Indy Eleven	Atlético Ottawa	Free
10 February 2022	(Canada) Felix N'sa	York United	FC Edmonton	Loan
10 February 2022	(Germany) Julian Ulbricht	York United	FC Edmonton	Loan
10 February 2022	(Germany) Tobias Warschewski	FC Edmonton	York United	Free
10 February 2022	(Germany) Tobias Warschewski	York United	FC Edmonton	Loan
11 February 2022	(Canada) Ryan Lindsay	York United	(Estonia) Narva Trans	Free
15 February 2022	(Canada) Noah Jensen	(United States) Oakland University	Forge	Free
15 February 2022	(Jamaica) Shawn-Claud Lawson	Atlético Ottawa	Simcoe County Rovers	Free
15 February 2022	(Canada) Cale Loughrey	(United States) UAB	Forge	Free
15 February 2022	(France) Guillaume Pianelli	UQTR	Forge	Draft
15 February 2022	(Canada) Ballou Tabla	CF Montréal	Atlético Ottawa	Free
15 February 2022	(Canada) Simon Triantafillou	(United States) Providence College	Forge	Free
16 February 2022	(Canada) Abdul Binate	CF Montréal	Pacific	Free
16 February 2022	(Canada) Matthew Catavolo	CF Montréal	Valour	Free
16 February 2022	(Canada) Mohamed Omar	(United States) University of Notre Dame	HFX Wanderers	Free
17 February 2022	(Algeria) Masta Kacher	Valour	FC Edmonton	Free
17 February 2022	(Canada) Charlie Trafford	(Wales) Wrexham	Cavalry	Free
18 February 2022	(Canada) Mamadou Ba	Atlético Ottawa	CF Montréal U23	Free
18 February 2022	(Netherlands) Djenairo Daniels	(Netherlands) Jong Utrecht	Pacific	Free
22 February 2022	(Guinea) Mamadi Camara	HFX Wanderers	FC Edmonton	Free
22 February 2022	(Spain) Diego Espejo	(Spain) Atlético Madrid B	Atlético Ottawa	Loan
22 February 2022	(Mexico) Vladimir Moragrega	(Mexico) Atlético San Luis	Atlético Ottawa	Loan
23 February 2022	(Canada) Kadin Chung	Pacific	Toronto FC	Free
25 February 2022	(Canada) Nyal Higgins	Toronto FC II	FC Edmonton	Free
28 February 2022	(Canada) Kwame Awuah	Forge	(United States) St. Louis City 2	Free
3 March 2022	(Trinidad and Tobago) Luke Singh	Toronto FC	FC Edmonton	Loan
4 March 2022	(England) Vashon Neufville	Atlético Ottawa	(England) Walton Casuals	Free
4 March 2022	(Germany) Mélé Temguia	FC Edmonton	(United States) Forward Madison	Free
7 March 2022	(Jamaica) Nicholas Hamilton	York United	(Jamaica) Harbour View	Free
7 March 2022	(England) Nathan Mavila	(England) Wingate & Finchley	Pacific	Free
10 March 2022	(Canada) Matthew Nogueira	(Portugal) Marítimo	York United	Free
10 March 2022	(France) Abdoul Sissoko	Kuwait SC	Atlético Ottawa	Free
11 March 2022	(Canada) Kamron Habibullah	Vancouver Whitecaps	Pacific	Loan
11 March 2022	(Canada) Sean Rea	CF Montréal	Valour	Loan
11 March 2022	(Canada) Jonathan Sirois	CF Montréal	Valour	Loan
14 March 2022	(Canada) Matt Silva	Valour	(Philippines) United City	Free
16 March 2022	(Guinea-Bissau) Umaro Baldé	(Scotland) Rangers	Pacific	Free
16 March 2022	(Germany) Julian Roloff	(Germany) 1. FC Köln II	Cavalry	Free
18 March 2022	(Canada) Jean-Aniel Assi	CF Montréal	Cavalry	Loan
18 March 2022	(Canada) Mohamed Farsi	Cavalry	(United States) Columbus Crew 2	Free
18 March 2022	(Canada) Georges Mukumbilwa	Vancouver Whitecaps	Pacific	Free
18 March 2022	(Canada) Karifa Yao	CF Montréal	Cavalry	Loan
22 March 2022	(Canada) Kairo Coore	Cape Breton University	FC Edmonton	Draft
23 March 2022	(Canada) Terique Mohammed	(Republic of Ireland) Dundalk	FC Edmonton	Free
24 March 2022	(Estonia) Andreas Vaikla	Toronto FC II	FC Edmonton	Loan
25 March 2022	(Canada) Marcus Simmons	York University	FC Edmonton	Free
28 March 2022	(Canada) Gabriel Bitar	(Lebanon) Ansar	FC Edmonton	Free
29 March 2022	(Democratic Republic of the Congo) Ousman Maheshe	NAIT	HFX Wanderers	Free
29 March 2022	(Democratic Republic of the Congo) Ousman Maheshe	HFX Wanderers	FC Edmonton	Loan
29 March 2022	(Canada) C. J. Smith	(United States) Houston Baptist	HFX Wanderers	Free
29 March 2022	(Canada) C. J. Smith	HFX Wanderers	FC Edmonton	Loan
29 March 2022	(Canada) Wesley Timoteo	(Cyprus) PO Xylotymbou	HFX Wanderers	Free
29 March 2022	(Canada) Wesley Timoteo	HFX Wanderers	FC Edmonton	Loan
31 March 2022	(Canada) Klaidi Cela	Forge	Toronto FC II	Free
31 March 2022	(Canada) Stefan Karajovanovic	HFX Wanderers	Toronto FC II	Free
1 April 2022	(Canada) Jacob Carlos	Ryerson University	Valour	Draft
1 April 2022	(Portugal) José da Cunha	Cape Breton University	Atlético Ottawa	Draft
1 April 2022	(United States) Azriel Gonzalez	(United States) Tacoma Defiance	York United	Free
1 April 2022	(United States) Azriel Gonzalez	York United	FC Edmonton	Loan
1 April 2022	(Trinidad and Tobago) Ryan Telfer	Atlético Ottawa	(United States) Columbus Crew 2	Free
5 April 2022	(Canada) Dino Bontis	Toronto FC Academy	Forge	Free
5 April 2022	(Canada) Cale Loughrey	Forge	FC Edmonton	Loan
5 April 2022	(Canada) Shamit Shome	FC Edmonton	Forge	Free
5 April 2022	(Canada) Shamit Shome	Forge	FC Edmonton	Loan
6 April 2022	(Canada) Osaze De Rosario	(Ukraine) Rukh Lviv	York United	Free
6 April 2022	(Canada) Nic Gagan	Ottawa South United	HFX Wanderers	Free
6 April 2022	(Canada) Colin Gander	University of Guelph	HFX Wanderers	Draft
6 April 2022	(Canada) Ryan Robinson	Vaughan Azzurri	HFX Wanderers	Free
8 April 2022	(England) Abdulmalik Owolabi-Belewu	(Italy) SPAL	Forge	Free
8 April 2022	(Canada) Skyler Rogers	Calgary Foothills	Cavalry	Free
15 April 2022	(Canada) Simon Triantafillou	Forge	Pacific	Free
15 April 2022	(Canada) Simon Triantafillou	Pacific	FC Edmonton	Loan
16 April 2022	(Canada) Daniel Stampatori	Sigma FC	Forge	Free
19 April 2022	(Canada) José Hernández	Cavalry	Rivers FC	Free
21 April 2022	(Canada) Austin Ricci	Valour	York United	Free
22 April 2022	(Haiti) Bicou Bissainthe	(Armenia) Sevan	Pacific	Free
22 April 2022	(Haiti) Bicou Bissainthe	Pacific	FC Edmonton	Loan
28 April 2022	(England) Aribim Pepple	(Spain) Getafe	Cavalry	Free
30 April 2022	(Netherlands) Bradley Vliet	(Netherlands) Dordrecht	Cavalry	Free
1 May 2022	(Canada) Kelsey Egwu	BTB Academy	FC Edmonton	Free
1 May 2022	(Canada) Malik Sylvester	BTB Academy	FC Edmonton	Free
7 May 2022	(Canada) Baj Maan	Forge	Toronto FC II	Free
9 May 2022	(Canada) Evan Barker	FC Manitoba	Valour	Free
9 May 2022	(Senegal) Mour Samb	(Senegal) Diambars	HFX Wanderers	Free
11 May 2022	(Spain) Iván Pérez	(Spain) SS Reyes	Atlético Ottawa	Loan
12 May 2022	(Canada) Luca Ricci	Université de Montréal	Pacific	Draft
19 May 2022	(Albania) Rezart Rama	(England) Nottingham Forest	Forge	Free
21 May 2022	(Canada) Niko Giantsopoulos	York United	Vancouver Whitecaps	Loan
31 May 2022	(Colombia) Kevin Rendon	(Colombia) Deportivo Pasto	Valour	Free
10 June 2022	(Denmark) Daniel Obbekjær	York United	(Faroe Islands) 07 Vestur	Free
21 June 2022	(Canada) Victor Loturi	Cavalry	(Scotland) Ross County	Undisclosed
24 June 2022	(Australia) Tass Mourdoukoutas	(Australia) Western Sydney Wanderers	York United	Free
1 July 2022	(Canada) Ronan Kratt	(Germany) SSV Ulm	York United	Free
1 July 2022	(Canada) Diyaeddine Abzi	York United	(France) Pau	Undisclosed
5 July 2022	(Spain) Roberto Alarcón	(Romania) Universitatea Cluj	Cavalry	Free
6 July 2022	(Australia) Luis Lawrie-Lattanzio	(Australia) Campbelltown City	York United	Free
8 July 2022	(Algeria) Nassim Mekidèche	(Tunisia) CS Hammam-Lif	Valour	Free
11 July 2022	(Canada) Mouhamadou Kane	York United	FC Edmonton	Loan
11 July 2022	(Germany) Julian Ulbricht	York United	(Germany) Phönix Lübeck	Undisclosed
12 July 2022	(Portugal) Kevin dos Santos	(England) Darlington	York United	Free
13 July 2022	(Haiti) Mikaël Cantave	(Romania) Chindia Târgoviște	Cavalry	Free
13 July 2022	(England) Lifumpa Mwandwe	(Wales) Newtown	HFX Wanderers	Free
17 July 2022	(South Sudan) William Akio	Valour	(Scotland) Ross County	Undisclosed
18 July 2022	(Canada) Owen Antoniuk	Vancouver Whitecaps	Atlético Ottawa	Loan
21 July 2022	(Turks and Caicos Islands) Billy Forbes	(United States) Detroit City	Valour	Loan
27 July 2022	(Canada) Michael Harms	Calgary Foothills	Cavalry	Free
29 July 2022	(Canada) Paris Gee	FC Edmonton	York United	Free
30 July 2022	(Denmark) Ludwig Kodjo Amla	St-Hubert	HFX Wanderers	Free
2 August 2022	(England) Aribim Pepple	Cavalry	(England) Luton Town	Undisclosed
3 August 2022	(Canada) Lowell Wright	York United	Vancouver Whitecaps	Undisclosed
5 August 2022	(Canada) Jordan Hamilton	(Republic of Ireland) Sligo Rovers	Forge	Free
10 August 2022	(Syria) Molham Babouli	(Qatar) Muaither	York United	Free
10 August 2022	(Spain) Sergio Camus	(Spain) Atlético Madrid B	Atlético Ottawa	Loan
10 August 2022	(Mexico) Alejandro Díaz	Pacific	(Norway) Sogndal	Undisclosed
10 August 2022	(Canada) Goteh Ntignee	(Germany) Grimma	Cavalry	Free
15 August 2022	(El Salvador) Gabriel Escobar	TSS FC Rovers	HFX Wanderers	Free
15 August 2022	(Canada) Nassim Nouajaa	CF Montréal U23	HFX Wanderers	Free
18 August 2022	(Canada) Owen Dagelman	(Germany) Chemnitzer FC	HFX Wanderers	Free
18 August 2022	(Canada) Adisa De Rosario	Toronto FC II	HFX Wanderers	Free
31 August 2022	(Canada) Gabriel Carvalho	West Ottawa	Atlético Ottawa	Free
31 August 2022	(Canada) Omar Darwish	West Ottawa	Atlético Ottawa	Free
1 September 2022	(Canada) Anthony Domanico	Ottawa South United	Atlético Ottawa	Free
29 September 2022	(Canada) Adisa De Rosario	HFX Wanderers	Toronto FC II	End of developmental deal
