= 2022 FC Edmonton season =

FC Edmonton
2022 season
- General manager: Jeff Harrop
- Head coach: Alan Koch
- Stadium: Clarke Stadium
- Canadian Premier League: 8th
- Canadian Championship: Preliminary Round
- Top goalscorer: League: Mamadi Camara; Tobias Warschewski (4 each); All: Tobias Warschewski (5)
- Highest home attendance: 1,275 (May 22 vs. Atlético Ottawa)
- Lowest home attendance: 600 (April 15 vs. York United FC)
- Average home league attendance: 927

The 2022 FC Edmonton season was the eleventh and final season in the history of FC Edmonton. In addition to the Canadian Premier League, the club competed in the Canadian Championship. The club was run directly by the CPL as the league searched for a new owner.

== Squad ==
As of July 11, 2022

No.	Name	Nationality	Position(s)	Date of birth (age)	Previous club
Goalkeepers
1	Andreas Vaikla	(Estonia) (Canada)	GK	February 19, 1997 (aged 25)	(Canada) Toronto FC II
48	Darlington Murasiranwa	(Zimbabwe) (Canada)	GK	February 7, 2001 (aged 21)	(Canada) Whitecaps FC Academy
90	Joseph Holliday	(Canada)	GK	January 8, 2005 (aged 17)	Academy
Defenders
2	Kelsey Egwu	(Canada) (Nigeria)	CB	February 1, 2004 (aged 18)	(Canada) BTB Academy
4	Luke Singh	(Trinidad and Tobago) (Canada)	CB	September 12, 2000 (aged 22)	(Canada) Toronto FC
5	Malik Sylvester	(Canada)	CB		(Canada) BTB Academy
14	Cale Loughrey	(Canada)	CB	August 4, 2001 (aged 21)	(Canada) Forge FC
18	Nyal Higgins	(Canada)	CB / RB	January 19, 1998 (aged 24)	(Canada) Atlético Ottawa
19	T-Boy Fayia	(Liberia) (Canada)	CB	February 1, 2001 (aged 21)	(Canada) York United
22	Wesley Timoteo	(Canada) (Portugal)	FB	April 9, 2000 (aged 22)	(Cyprus) PO Xylotymbou
36	Felix N'sa	(Canada) (Democratic Republic of the Congo)	CB	September 25, 2003 (aged 19)	(Canada) Whitecaps FC Academy
40	Nekhi Wright	(Canada)	RB		(Canada) BTB Academy
57	Terique Mohammed	(Canada) (Trinidad and Tobago)	LB	January 27, 2000 (aged 22)	(Republic of Ireland) Dundalk
Midfielders
8	Shamit Shome	(Canada) (Bangladesh)	AM	September 5, 1997 (aged 25)	(Canada) Montreal Impact
11	Azriel Gonzalez	(United States) (Mexico)	AM / LW	May 24, 2001 (aged 21)	(United States) Tacoma Defiance
12	Ousman Maheshe	(Democratic Republic of the Congo) (Canada)	RW / LW / FB	April 2, 2002 (aged 20)	(Canada) NAIT Ooks
16	Marcus Simmons	(Canada)	LW / LB / ST	July 16, 2000 (aged 22)	(Canada) York Lions
17	CJ Smith	(Canada)	RW / LW	January 12, 1998 (aged 24)	(United States) Houston Baptist Huskies
21	Simon Triantafillou	(Canada) (Greece)	AM	January 1, 1999 (aged 23)	(United States) Providence Friars
25	Bicou Bissainthe	(Haiti)	DM / CB	March 15, 1999 (aged 23)	(Armenia) Sevan
30	Gabriel Bitar	(Lebanon) (Canada)	AM / CF	August 23, 1998 (aged 24)	(Canada) Carleton Ravens
Forwards
6	Mamadi Camara	(Guinea) (Canada)	CF	February 25, 1995 (aged 27)	(Canada) HFX Wanderers
7	Masta Kacher	(Algeria) (Canada)	CF / AM	November 8, 1995 (aged 27)	(Canada) Valour FC
9	Mouhamadou Kane	(Canada) (Senegal)	CF	October 12, 2003 (aged 19)	(Canada) York United
10	Tobias Warschewski	(Germany)	CF / RW	February 6, 1998 (aged 24)	(Germany) Phönix Lübeck
45	Kairo Coore	(Canada)	ST	January 12, 2001 (aged 21)	(Canada) CBU Capers

== Transfers ==
=== In ===
No.	Pos.	Player	From club	Fee/notes	Date	Source
18	DF	(Canada) Nyal Higgins	(Canada) Atlético Ottawa	Free	February 25, 2022	
7	FW	(Algeria) Masta Kacher	(Canada) Valour FC	Free	February 17, 2022	
6	FW	(Canada) Mamadi Camara	(Canada) HFX Wanderers FC	Free	February 22, 2022	
45	FW	(Canada) Kairo Coore	(Canada) CBU Capers	Selected 2nd overall in the 2022 CPL–U Sports Draft	March 22, 2022	
57	DF	(Canada) Terique Mohammed	(Republic of Ireland) Dundalk F.C.	Free	March 23, 2022	
16	FW	(Canada) Marcus Simmons	(Canada) York Lions	Free	March 25, 2022	
30	FW	(Canada) Gabriel Bitar	(Canada) Carleton Ravens	Free	March 28, 2022	
2	DF	(Canada) Kelsey Egwu	(Canada) BTB Academy	Signed to a development contract	April 30, 2022	
5	DF	(Canada) Malik Sylvester	(Canada) BTB Academy	Signed to a development contract	April 30, 2022	
90	GK	(Canada) Joseph Holliday	Academy	Signed to a development contract	May 6, 2022	
40	DF	(Canada) Nekhi Wright	(Canada) BTB Academy	Signed to a development contract	May 14, 2022	

==== Loans in ====
No.	Pos.	Player	Loaned from	Fee/notes	Date	Source
9	FW	(Germany) Julian Ulbricht	(Canada) York United	Season-long loan; recalled on July 11, 2022	February 10, 2022	
10	FW	(Germany) Tobias Warschewski	(Canada) York United	Season-long loan	February 10, 2022	
36	DF	(Canada) Felix N'sa	(Canada) York United	Season-long loan	February 10, 2022	
4	DF	(Canada) Luke Singh	(Canada) Toronto FC	Season-long loan	March 3, 2022	
1	GK	(Estonia) Andreas Vaikla	(Canada) Toronto FC	Season-long loan	March 24, 2022	
12	DF	(Democratic Republic of the Congo) Ousman Maheshe	(Canada) HFX Wanderers	Season-long loan	March 29, 2022	
22	DF	(Canada) Wesley Timóteo	(Canada) HFX Wanderers	Season-long loan	March 29, 2022	
17	MF	(Canada) CJ Smith	(Canada) HFX Wanderers	Season-long loan	March 29, 2022	
11	MF	(United States) Azriel Gonzalez	(Canada) York United	Season-long loan	April 1, 2022	
8	MF	(Canada) Shamit Shome	(Canada) Forge FC	Season-long loan	April 5, 2022	
14	DF	(Canada) Cale Loughrey	(Canada) Forge FC	Season-long loan	April 5, 2022	
21	MF	(Canada) Simon Triantafillou	(Canada) Pacific FC	Season-long loan	April 15, 2022	
25	MF	(Haiti) Bicou Bissainthe	(Canada) Pacific FC	Season-long loan	April 22, 2022	
9	FW	(Canada) Mouhamadou Kane	(Canada) York United	Season-long loan	July 11, 2022	

==== Draft picks ====
FC Edmonton will make the following selections in the 2022 CPL–U Sports Draft. Draft picks are not automatically signed to the team roster. Only those who are signed to a contract will be listed as transfers in.

Round	Selection	Pos.	Player	Nationality	University
1	2	FW	Kairo Coore	Canada	Cape Breton
2	10	FW	Quentin Paumier	France	Montréal

=== Out ===
No.	Pos.	Player	To club	Fee/notes	Date	Source
1	GK	(Canada) Connor James	N/A	Retired	November 13, 2021	
4	DF	(Canada) Allan Zebie	N/A	Retired	November 14, 2021	
3	DF	(Cameroon) Jeannot Esua		Contract expired	December 31, 2021	
5	DF	(Spain) Ramón Soria		Contract expired	December 31, 2021	
8	DF	(Germany) Mélé Temguia	(United States) Forward Madison FC	Contract expired	December 31, 2021	
12	DF	(Democratic Republic of the Congo) Sharly Mabussi		Contract expired	December 31, 2021	
27	DF	(United States) Hunter Gorskie	(United States) Orange County SC	Contract expired	December 31, 2021	
55	DF	(Canada) Amer Didic	(Canada) Pacific FC	Contract expired	December 31, 2021	
2	MF	(Canada) Paris Gee		Contract expired	December 31, 2021	
7	MF	(Canada) Shamit Shome	(Canada) Forge FC	Contract expired	December 31, 2021	
10	MF	(Canada) Kyle Porter	(Canada) Blue Devils FC	Contract expired	December 31, 2021	
17	MF	(Canada) Marcus Velado-Tsegaye		Contract expired	December 31, 2021	
20	MF	(Canada) Antony Caceres		Contract expired	December 31, 2021	
21	MF	(Canada) Tomas Giraldo	(Canada) CF Montréal	Loan expired	December 31, 2021	
28	MF	(Canada) Thomas Gardner	(Canada) Varsity FC	Contract expired	December 31, 2021	
33	MF	(Canada) Fraser Aird	(Canada) Cavalry FC	Contract expired	December 31, 2021	
13	FW	(United States) Roberto Avila	(United States) Houston Dynamo 2	Loan expired	December 31, 2021	
19	FW	(Germany) Tobias Warschewski	(Canada) York United	Contract expired	December 31, 2021	
26	FW	(Canada) Matthew Durrans	(Germany) FC Pipinsried	Contract expired	December 31, 2021	
9	FW	(Canada) Easton Ongaro	(Romania) UTA Arad	Contract expired	January 12, 2022	

== Pre-season and friendlies ==
Win Draw Loss Fixtures

March 15 Friendly	FC Edmonton	3–3	FC Tigers Vancouver	Edmonton, Alberta
		Report		Stadium: Edmonton Soccer Dome

March 26 Friendly	University of Alberta Golden Bears	1–3	FC Edmonton	Edmonton, Alberta
	Goal	Report	Kacher 85'	Stadium: Foote Field

April 1 Friendly	FC Edmonton	1–0	MacEwan Griffins	Edmonton, Alberta
10:00am	Ulbricht	Report		Stadium: Clarke Stadium

== Competitions ==
Matches are listed in Edmonton local time: Mountain Daylight Time (UTC−6) until November 5, and Mountain Standard Time (UTC−7) otherwise.

=== Overview ===
Competition	First match	Last match	Starting round	Final position	Record							
Competition	First match	Last match	Starting round	Final position	Pld	W	D	L	GF	GA	GD	Win %
Canadian Premier League	April 10	October 8	Matchday 1	8	28	4	8	16	31	51	−20	14.29
Canadian Championship	May 10	May 10	Preliminary round	Preliminary round	1	0	0	1	1	2	−1	0.00
Total					29	4	8	17	32	53	−21	13.79

Last updated: October 9, 2022
Source: Competitions

=== Canadian Premier League ===
==== Table ====
Pos	Team	Pld	W	D	L	GF	GA	GD	Pts	Qualification
1	Atlético Ottawa (S)	28	13	10	5	36	29	+7	49	Advance to playoffs
2	Forge (C)	28	14	5	9	47	25	+22	47	Advance to playoffs
3	Cavalry	28	14	5	9	39	33	+6	47	Advance to playoffs
4	Pacific	28	13	7	8	36	33	+3	46	Advance to playoffs
5	Valour	28	10	7	11	36	34	+2	37	
6	York United	28	9	7	12	31	37	−6	34	
7	HFX Wanderers	28	8	5	15	24	38	−14	29	
8	FC Edmonton	28	4	8	16	31	51	−20	20	

Source: CanPL.ca
Rules for classification: 1) points; 2) total wins; 3) goal differential; 4) goals for; 5) away goals differential; 6) away goals for; 7) home goals differential; 8) home goals for; 9) U-21 minutes; 10) coin toss or drawing of lots.
(C) Champion; (S) Regular season winner

==== Results by match ====
Match	1	2	3	4	5	6	7	8	9	10	11	12	13	14	15	16	17	18	19	20	21	22	23	24	25	26	27	28
Result	D	D	L	D	L	L	L	L	L	D	L	W	L	W	L	L	D	L	L									
Position	5	4	7	7	8	8	8	8	8	8	8	8	8	8	8	8	8	8	8									

Updated to match(es) played on August 7, 2022. Source: #Matches
W = Win; D = Draw; L = Loss

==== Matches ====
April 10 1	FC Edmonton	1–1	Valour FC	Edmonton, Alberta
2:00pm	Warschewski 90+5'	Report	Baquero 45+1'; Dyer (yellow card) 64'; Akio (yellow card) 90'	Stadium: Clarke Stadium; Attendance: 670; Referee: Filip Dujic

April 15 2	FC Edmonton	1–1	York United FC	Edmonton, Alberta
7:00pm	Kacher 84'; Smith (red card) 88'	Report	Wilson (yellow card) 23'; Thompson (yellow card) 25'; Zator (yellow card) 55'; De Rosario 82'; Abzi (yellow card) 88'; Giantsopoulos (yellow card) 89'	Stadium: Clarke Stadium; Attendance: 600; Referee: Juan Marquez

April 23 3	Forge FC	3–0	FC Edmonton	Hamilton, Ontario
2:00pm	Campbell 34', 69'; Borges 45'; Samuel (yellow card) 59'; Pacius (yellow card) 79'	Report	Triantafillou (yellow card) 33'; Singh (yellow card) 64'; Camara (yellow card) 88'	Stadium: Tim Hortons Field; Attendance: 3,133; Referee: David Barrie

April 27 4	FC Edmonton	0–0	Pacific FC	Edmonton, Alberta
7:00pm	Singh (yellow card) 32'	Report	Aparicio (yellow card) 37'; Mukumbilwa (yellow card) 73'	Stadium: Clarke Stadium; Attendance: 765; Referee: Scott Bowman

April 30 5	HFX Wanderers FC	3–1	FC Edmonton	Halifax, Nova Scotia
12:00pm	Tabi (yellow card) 8'; Bent 17'; Rampersad (yellow card) 28'; Salter 61'; Garcia 71' (pen.)	Report	Ulbricht 9' (pen.); Mohammed (yellow card) 14'; Triantafillou (yellow card) 65'; Vaikla (yellow card) 70'	Stadium: Wanderers Grounds; Attendance: 6,213; Referee: Ben Hoskins

May 6 6	FC Edmonton	0–3	Cavalry FC	Edmonton, Alberta
8:00pm	Timoteo (yellow card) 83'	Report	Vliet (yellow card) 4'; Mason 30'; Musse 34'; Carducci (yellow card) 65'; Simmons (yellow card) 69'; Yao (yellow card) 69'; Loturi (yellow card) 76'; Loughrey 88' (o.g.)	Stadium: Clarke Stadium; Attendance: 1,044; Referee: David Barrie

May 14 7	Pacific FC	2–1	FC Edmonton	Langford, British Columbia
5:00pm	Díaz 10'; Heard 62'; Habibullah (yellow card) 74'; Daniels (yellow card) 86'	Report	Mohammed (yellow card) 10'; Timoteo 73'	Stadium: Starlight Stadium; Attendance: 3,424; Referee: Carly Shaw-MacLaren

May 22 8	FC Edmonton	1–2	Atlético Ottawa	Edmonton, Alberta
2:00pm	Singh (yellow card) 66' (yellow-red card) 80'; Warschewski 74' (pen.); Higgins (yellow card) 90+4'; Mohammed (yellow card) 90+5'	Report	Tissot (yellow card) 22'; Wright 40'; Bassett 70' (pen.)	Stadium: Clarke Stadium; Attendance: 1,275; Referee: Alain Ruch

May 31 9	FC Edmonton	3–4	Forge FC	Edmonton, Alberta
7:00pm	Camara 12'; Hojabrpour 34' (o.g.); Coore 87'; Triantafillou (yellow card) 90+3'	Report	Borges 23', 61', 82' (pen.); Sissoko (yellow card) 42'; Bekker (yellow card) 43'; Bissainthe 64' (o.g.)	Stadium: Clarke Stadium; Attendance: 897; Referee: Mathieu Souaré

June 5 10	Valour FC	1–1	FC Edmonton	Winnipeg, Manitoba
2:00pm	Gutiérrez (yellow card) 50'; Fordyce (yellow card) 60'; Akio 90+4'	Report	Camara 32', (yellow card) 90+1'; Bitar (yellow card) 90+1'	Stadium: IG Field; Attendance: 2,727; Referee: Renzo Villanueva

June 14 11	FC Edmonton	1–2	HFX Wanderers FC	Edmonton, Alberta
8:00pm	Timoteo 10', (yellow card) 51'; Loughrey (yellow card) 85'; Smith (yellow card) 90'	Report	Polisi (yellow card) 24'; Salter 53', 59'; Gagnon-Laparé (yellow card) 88'; Fernandez (yellow card) 90'	Stadium: Clarke Stadium; Attendance: 784; Referee: Fabrizio Stasolla

June 19 12	FC Edmonton	1–0	Atlético Ottawa	Edmonton, Alberta
3:00pm	Higgins (yellow card) 57'; Bissainthe 65'	Report	Bassett (yellow card) 26'; Sissoko (yellow card) 64'	Stadium: Clarke Stadium; Attendance: 1,177; Referee: Michael Venne

June 26 13	Cavalry FC	3–1	FC Edmonton	Foothills County, Alberta
5:00pm	M. Trafford (yellow card) 10'; Pepple 26', 48' (pen.), (yellow card) 58'; Higgins 29' (o.g.); Adekugbe (yellow card) 51'	Report	Triantafillou (yellow card) 11'; Bitar 45'; Gonzalez (yellow card) 53'; Singh (yellow card) 67'	Stadium: ATCO Field; Attendance: 4,743; Referee: David Barrie

July 1 14	FC Edmonton	3–0	York United FC	Edmonton, Alberta
4:00pm	Bissainte 24'; Camara 57', (yellow card) 58'; Bitar 59'	Report	Ferrari (yellow card) 71'; Wilson (yellow card) 75'; Johnston (yellow card) 90'	Stadium: Clarke Stadium; Attendance: 1,133; Referee: Renzo Villanueva

July 9 15	FC Edmonton	2–3	Pacific FC	Edmonton, Alberta
2:00pm	Bitar 79'; Camara 83'	Report	Young 39', (yellow card) 89'; Heard 43'; Daniels 59'	Stadium: Clarke Stadium; Attendance: 1,356; Referee: Mo Mohseni

July 19 16	Forge FC	5–1	FC Edmonton	Hamilton, Ontario
4:45pm	Pacius 26', 38' (pen.), 74'; Sissoko 45+1'; Bekker 45+4'	Report	Camara (yellow card) 33'; Coore 57'	Stadium: Tim Hortons Field; Attendance: 3,121; Referee: Mario Al-Ayass

July 23 17	HFX Wanderers FC	1–1	FC Edmonton	Halifax, Nova Scotia
11:30am	Rampersad (yellow card) 16'; Salter 77' (pen.); Lamothe (yellow card) 83'	Report	Higgins (yellow card) 3'; Warschewski 19' (pen.); Simmons (yellow card) 27'; Singh (yellow card) 43'; Bissainthe (yellow card) 90+5'	Stadium: Wanderers Grounds; Attendance: 5,724; Referee: Juan Marquez

July 30 18	Cavalry FC	2–0	FC Edmonton	Foothills County, Alberta
4:00pm	Mason 28'; Yao 43'; Alarcón (yellow card) 52'; Klomp (yellow card) 84'; Norman Jr. (yellow card) 90+6'	Report	Smith (yellow card) 38'; Gonzalez (yellow card) 79'	Stadium: ATCO Field; Attendance: 3,446; Referee: Filip Dujic

August 7 19	Atlético Ottawa	2–1	FC Edmonton	Ottawa, Ontario
12:00pm	Tabla 70', 75'; Niba (yellow card) 90'; Antoniuk (yellow card) 90'; Alemán (yellow card) 90+5'	Report	Camara (yellow card) 62'; Warschewski 86'; Mohammed (yellow card) 90+2'	Stadium: TD Place; Attendance: 6,574; Referee: Myriam Marcotte

August 14 20	York United FC	v	FC Edmonton	Toronto, Ontario
2:00pm				Stadium: York Lions Stadium

August 21 21	Valour FC	v	FC Edmonton	Winnipeg, Manitoba
12:30pm				Stadium: IG Field

August 28 22	FC Edmonton	v	HFX Wanderers FC	Edmonton, Alberta
4:00pm				Stadium: Clarke Stadium

September 2 23	Atlético Ottawa	v	FC Edmonton	Ottawa, Ontario
5:00pm				Stadium: TD Place

September 9 24	York United FC	v	FC Edmonton	Toronto, Ontario
5:30pm				Stadium: York Lions Stadium

September 17 25	FC Edmonton	v	Cavalry FC	Edmonton, Alberta
2:00pm				Stadium: Clarke Stadium

September 25 26	FC Edmonton	v	Forge FC	Edmonton, Alberta
2:00pm				Stadium: Clarke Stadium

September 30 27	Pacific FC	v	FC Edmonton	Langford, British Columbia
8:00pm				Stadium: Starlight Stadium

October 8 28	FC Edmonton	v	Valour FC	Edmonton, Alberta
1:00pm				Stadium: Clarke Stadium

=== Canadian Championship ===
May 10 PR	Cavalry FC	2–1	FC Edmonton	Foothills County, Alberta
7:30pm	Bevan 17', 36' (pen.); Klomp (yellow card) 46'; Trafford (yellow card) 90+4'	Report	Higgins (yellow card) 11'; Simmons (yellow card) 45'; Loughrey (yellow card) 47'; Warschewski 55' (pen.)	Stadium: ATCO Field; Referee: Juan Marquez

== Statistics ==
=== Squad and statistics ===
As of July 7, 2022

No.	Pos	Nat	Player	Total		Canadian Premier League		Canadian Championship	
No.	Pos	Nat	Player	Apps	Goals	Apps	Goals	Apps	Goals
1	GK	(Estonia) EST	Andreas Vaikla	14	0	13+0	0	1+0	0
2	DF	(Canada) CAN	Kelsey Egwu	1	0	1+0	0	0+0	0
4	DF	(Trinidad and Tobago) TTO	Luke Singh	13	0	12+0	0	1+0	0
6	MF	(Canada) CAN	Mamadi Camara	13	3	11+1	3	1+0	0
7	FW	(Algeria) ALG	Mastanabal Kacher	12	1	4+8	1	0+0	0
8	MF	(Canada) CAN	Shamit Shome	10	0	9+1	0	0+0	0
9	FW	(Germany) GER	Julian Ulbricht	9	1	5+3	1	0+1	0
10	FW	(Germany) GER	Tobias Warschewski	12	3	9+2	2	1+0	1
11	MF	(United States) USA	Azriel Gonzalez	10	0	7+3	0	0+0	0
14	DF	(Canada) CAN	Cale Loughrey	12	0	7+4	0	1+0	0
16	FW	(Canada) CAN	Marcus Simmons	12	0	10+1	0	1+0	0
17	MF	(Canada) CAN	CJ Smith	10	0	1+8	0	0+1	0
18	DF	(Canada) CAN	Nyal Higgins	14	0	13+0	0	1+0	0
19	DF	(Canada) CAN	T-Boy Fayia	11	0	7+3	0	1+0	0
21	DF	(Canada) CAN	Simon Triantafillou	13	0	8+4	0	1+0	0
22	DF	(Canada) CAN	Wesley Timoteo	15	2	10+4	2	1+0	0
25	MF	(Haiti) HAI	Bicou Bissainte	8	2	7+1	2	0+0	0
30	FW	(Canada) CAN	Gabriel Bitar	14	2	13+0	2	1+0	0
45	FW	(Canada) CAN	Kairo Coore	10	1	3+6	1	0+1	0
57	DF	(Canada) CAN	Terique Mohammed	10	0	3+7	0	0+0	0

=== Top scorers ===
Rank	Nat.	Player	Pos.	Canadian Premier League	Canadian Championship	TOTAL
1	(Germany)	Tobias Warschewski	FW	1	0	1
1	(Algeria)	Masta Kacher	FW	1	0	1
Totals				2	0	2

=== Disciplinary record ===
No.	Pos.	Nat.	Player	Canadian Premier League		Canadian Championship		TOTAL	
No.	Pos.	Nat.	Player	Booked	Sent off (straight red)	Booked	Sent off (straight red)	Booked	Sent off (straight red)
17	MF	(Canada)	CJ Smith	0	1	0	0	0	1
Totals				0	1	0	0	0	1
