= 2026 Monterey Bay FC season =

Monterey Bay FC
2026 season
- Owners: Ray Beshoff
- Manager: Jordan Stewart
- Stadium: Cardinale Stadium
- USL Championship: Western Conference: 12th Overall: 23rd
- USLC playoffs: Did Not Qualify
- U.S. Open Cup: Did Not Qualify
- USL Cup: Group stage
- Average home league attendance: 3,446
Home colours	Away colours

The 2026 Monterey Bay FC season was the club's fifth season since their establishment on February 1, 2021.

== Background ==
The 2025 off-season featured a large amount of roster turnover, starting with initial roster decisions announced on November 25th. Only nine players were retained from the previous season's final roster of twenty-five. There would be further departures from this group in early 2026 as Nico Campuzano and Ethan Bryant would both mutually agree to part ways with Monterey Bay, while Mayele Malango, and Xavi Gnaulati would depart through transfers.

== Season squad ==
Squad No.	Name	Nationality	Position(s)	Date of birth (age)
Goalkeepers
1	Fernando Delgado	(Mexico)	GK	July 25, 2006 (age 20)
Defenders
3	Stuart Ritchie	(United States)	DF	September 10, 2001 (age 25)
5	Nico Gordon	(Montserrat)	DF	April 28, 2002 (age 24)
6	Luka Malešević	(Montenegro)	DF	August 1, 1998 (age 28)
22	Joel Garcia Jr.	(United States)	DF	April 26, 2002 (age 24)
25	Kelsey Egwu	(Canada)	DF	February 1, 2004 (age 22)
	Zack Farnsworth	(United States)	DF	July 13, 2002 (age 24)
Midfielders
4	Nicholas Ross	(Scotland)	MF	November 11, 1991 (age 34)
7	Adrian Rebollar	(United States)	MF	November 12, 1999 (age 26)
8	Giorgi Lomtadze	(Georgia (country))	MF	October 30, 2001 (age 25)
10	Facundo Canete	(Argentina)	MF	February 22, 2000 (age 26)
18	Belmar Joseph Jr.	(Haiti)	MF	October 13, 2005 (age 21)
23	Eduardo Blancas	(United States)	MF	November 14, 2001 (age 24)
41	Johnny Klein	(United States)	MF	November 7, 1999 (age 26)
Forwards
11	Wesley Leggett	(United States)	FW	March 16, 2001 (age 25)
20	Ilijah Paul	(United States)	FW	July 26, 2002 (age 24)
	Omari Glasgow	(Guyana)	FW	November 22, 2003 (age 22)
	Youssou Ndiaye	(Senegal)	FW	May 30, 2007 (age 19)

Last updated: February 18, 2026.
Source: Monterey Bay F.C., USL Championship

== Transfers ==
=== In ===
Pos.	Player	Signed from	Details	Date	Ref.
DF	(Canada) Kelsey Egwu	(Estonia) JK Narva Trans	Free transfer	December 8, 2025	
DF	(United States) Stuart Ritchie	(United States) One Knoxville SC	Free transfer	December 12, 2025	
MF	(United States) Eduardo Blancas	(United States) AV Alta FC	Free transfer	December 17, 2025	
FW	(United States) Wesley Leggett	(United States) Charleston Battery	Undisclosed fee	December 23, 2025	
MF	(Argentina) Facundo Canete	(United States) Carolina Core FC	Undisclosed fee	January 9, 2026	
GK	(Mexico) Fernando Delgado	(United States) Birmingham Legion FC	Free transfer	January 9, 2026	
MF	(Georgia (country)) Giorgi Lomtadze	(Georgia (country)) FC Dinamo Tbilisi	Free transfer	January 21, 2026	
DF	(Montenegro) Luka Malešević	(Montenegro) FK Mornar	Free transfer	January 22, 2026	
MF	(Scotland) Nick Ross	(United States) Sacramento Republic FC	Free transfer	January 23, 2026	
DF	(United States) Zack Farnsworth	(United States) Real Salt Lake	Free transfer	February 13, 2026	

=== Out ===
Date	Pos.	Player	To	Details	Ref.
November 25, 2025	FW	(United States) Alex Dixon	Free agency	Out of contract	
November 25, 2025	MF	(United States) Mobi Fehr	Free agency	Out of contract	
November 25, 2025	MF	(United States) Pierce Gallaway	Free agency	Out of contract	
November 25, 2025	GK	(United States) Sam Gomez	Free agency	Contract option declined	
November 25, 2025	FW	(United States) Diego Gutíerrez	Free agency	Contract option declined	
November 25, 2025	MF	(England) Wesley Fonguck	(England) Ebbsfleet United F.C.	Loan concluded	
November 25, 2025	DF	(United States) Sami Guediri	(United States) Union Omaha	Out of contract	
November 25, 2025	DF	(Mexico) Carlos Guzmán	(Canada) Inter Toronto FC	Out of contract	
November 25, 2025	FW	(Australia) Luke Ivanovic	(Finland) Turun Palloseura	Contract option declined	
November 25, 2025	DF	(United States) Alex Lara	Free agency	Out of contract	
November 25, 2025	DF	(United States) Miles Lyons	(United States) Charlotte Independence	Contract option declined	
November 25, 2025	DF	(New Zealand) Jacob Muir	(Australia) Avondale FC	Contract option declined	
November 25, 2025	GK	(United States) Dallas Odle	Free agency	Out of contract	
November 25, 2025	DF	(United States) Grant Robinson	Free agency	Out of contract	
November 25, 2025	FW	(Jamaica) Tarik Scott	(United States) FC Dallas	Loan concluded	
November 25, 2025	FW	(Denmark) Anton Søjberg	(India) East Bengal FC	Contract option declined	
January 2, 2026	GK	(Spain) Nico Campuzano	(United States) Pittsburgh Riverhounds SC	Mutually parted ways	
January 8, 2026	FW	(Malawi) Mayele Malango	(United States) Sacramento Republic FC	Club record fee	
January 9, 2026	MF	(United States) Xavi Gnaulati	(United States) Tacoma Defiance	Fee with future incentives	
February 13, 2026	MF	(United States) Ethan Bryant	(United States) Sarasota Paradise	Mutually parted ways	

=== Loaned In ===
Pos.	Player	Signed from	Details	Date	Ref.
FW	(Senegal) Youssou Ndiaye	(Senegal) Be Sport Academy	Undisclosed	January 8, 2026	
MF	(Haiti) Belmar Joseph	(Switzerland) FC Sion	Undisclosed	January 16, 2026	
FW	(Guyana) Omari Glasgow	(United States) Chicago Fire FC	Undisclosed	February 18, 2026	

== Competitions ==
=== Preseason ===
January 31 Preseason	San Jose Earthquakes	v	Monterey Bay FC	San Jose, California
				Stadium: PayPal Park
Note: Closed door scrimmage

February 21 Preseason	Oakland Roots SC	v	Monterey Bay FC	Oakland, California
Note: Closed door scrimmage

February 28 Preseason	Monterey Bay FC	v	C.F. Pachuca Select	Seaside, California
7:00 PM				Stadium: Cardinale Stadium

=== USL Championship ===
==== Standings ====
Pos	Team	Pld	W	L	T	GF	GA	GD	Pts	Qualification
8	Phoenix Rising FC	30	11	10	9	45	46	−1	42	Playoffs
9	Orange County SC	30	10	11	9	39	49	−10	39	
10	Oakland Roots SC	30	9	10	11	39	40	−1	38	
11	Las Vegas Lights FC	30	10	14	6	41	48	−7	36	
12	Monterey Bay FC	30	6	18	6	32	52	−20	24	

Updated to match(es) played on October 24, 2026. Source: USL Championship Standings
Rules for classification: 1) total wins against conference opponents; 2) goal differential against conference opponents; 3) goals scored against conference opponents; 4) head-to-head points against conference opponents; 5) points per game against conference opponents; 6) points per game against non-conference opponents; 7) fewest disciplinary points; 8) coin toss or drawing of lots

==== Matches ====
On December 10, 2025, the USL Championship released the regular season schedule for all 25 teams.

All times are in Pacific Standard Time.

March 7 1	Monterey Bay FC	0–1	Oakland Roots SC	Seaside, California
7:00 PM		Report	Fisher 85'	Stadium: Cardinale Stadium; Attendance: 4,240; Referee: Nabil Bensalah

March 14 2	Monterey Bay FC	0–3	El Paso Locomotive FC	Seaside, California
7:00 PM	Joseph (yellow card) 33' (yellow-red card) 66'	Report	Méndez 21'; Rubín 51'; Moreno 53'	Stadium: Cardinale Stadium; Attendance: 2,950; Referee: Servando Berna Rico

March 21 3	Sacramento Republic FC	1–1	Monterey Bay FC	Sacramento, California
7:00 PM	Ajago 62'	Report	Leggett 84'	Stadium: Heart Health Park; Attendance: 9,516; Referee: Rodrigo Albuquerque

March 28 4	Las Vegas Lights FC	1–0	Monterey Bay FC	Las Vegas, Nevada
7:30 PM	Rodriguez 49' (pen.)	Report		Stadium: Cashman Field; Attendance: 3,708; Referee: Brandon Stevis

April 4 5	Monterey Bay FC	0–0	San Antonio FC	Seaside, California
7:00 PM		Report		Stadium: Cardinale Stadium; Attendance: 3,430; Referee: Edson Carvajal

April 11 6	Indy Eleven	3–1	Monterey Bay FC	Indianapolis, Indiana
4:00 PM	Rendón 14'; Blake 55'; Mesanvi 68'	Report	Leggett 51'	Stadium: Michael A. Carroll Stadium; Attendance: 9,101; Referee: Joshua Encarnación

April 18 7	Colorado Springs Switchbacks FC	4–1	Monterey Bay FC	Colorado Springs, Colorado
2:00 PM	Perez 18'; Bennett 45+1', 73' (pen.); Tejada 70'	Report	Gindiri 57'	Stadium: Weidner Field; Attendance: 4,860; Referee: Robert Vincze

May 3 8	Monterey Bay FC	1–2	FC Tulsa	Seaside, California
4:00 PM	Gindiri 25'	Report	Webber 49' (pen.); Kocevski 57'	Stadium: Cardinale Stadium; Attendance: 3,603; Referee: Trevor Wiseman

May 8 9	Lexington SC	3–1	Monterey Bay FC	Lexington, Kentucky
7:30 PM	Firmino 26', 31'; Goodrum 56'	Report	Lletget 64'	Stadium: Lexington SC Stadium; Attendance: 5,108; Referee: Gerald Flores

May 23 10	Monterey Bay FC	2–0	Birmingham Legion FC	Seaside, California
6:00 PM	Bidois 60'; Blancas 78'	Report		Stadium: Cardinale Stadium; Referee: Matthew Corrigan

May 30 11	Monterey Bay FC	4–1	Loudoun United FC	Seaside, California
10:00 PM	Bidois 5', 62' (pen.); Leggett 11'; Nadje 86'	Report	Ordóñez 47'	Stadium: Cardinale Stadium; Attendance: 3,346; Referee: Brandon Stevis

June 10 12	Monterey Bay FC	2–1	Sporting JAX	Seaside, California
7:00 PM	Garcia Jr. 19'; Bidois 80'	Report	Sadlier 70'	Stadium: Cardinale Stadium; Attendance: 2,421; Referee: Matthew Thompson

June 17 13	FC Tulsa	2–0	Monterey Bay FC	Tulsa, Oklahoma
6:30 PM	Dorsey 26'; Batista 51'	Report		Stadium: ONEOK Field; Attendance: 2,421; Referee: Matthew Thompson

June 20 14	Monterey Bay FC	1–0	El Paso Locomotive FC	Seaside, California
7:00 PM	Gindiri 90+1'	Report		Stadium: Cardinale Stadium; Attendance: 3,292; Referee: Robert Vincze

July 4 15	San Antonio FC	0–0	Monterey Bay FC	San Antonio, Texas
6:00 PM	Batrouni (red card) 63'; Taintor (yellow card) 27' (yellow-red card) 90+10'	Report		Stadium: Toyota Field; Attendance: 7,074; Referee: Sergii Demianchuk

July 18 16	Phoenix Rising FC	3–2	Monterey Bay FC	Phoenix, Arizona
7:30 PM	Badji 30'; Arase 78'; Nakamura 84' (o.g.)	Report	Saidi 42'; Scearce 52' (o.g.)	Stadium: Phoenix Rising Soccer Stadium; Referee: Ekaterina Koroleva

July 25 17	Monterey Bay FC	1–2	Orange County SC	Seaside, CA
7:00 PM	Gindiri 88'	Report	Brewitt 48'; Gordon 51' (o.g.)	Stadium: Cardinale Stadium; Attendance: 3,800; Referee: Brad Jensen

August 1 18	Lexington SC	3–2	Monterey Bay FC	Lexington, Kentucky
7:00 PM	Rodrigues 29'; Nakamura 42' (o.g.); Scott 82'	Report	Lletget 2'; Barajas 26'	Stadium: Lexington SC Stadium; Attendance: 3,777; Referee: Cristian Campo Hernández

August 5 19	El Paso Locomotive FC	1–0	Monterey Bay FC	El Paso, Texas
5:00 PM	Méndez 30'	Report		Stadium: Southwest University Park; Attendance: 3,274; Referee: John Matto

August 8 20	Monterey Bay FC	2–5	New Mexico United	Seaside, California
8:00 PM	Nakamura 31'; Lletget 55'	Report	Noël 6', 77'; Hurst 74'; Harris 86'; Reid-Stephen 90+1'	Stadium: Cardinale Stadium; Attendance: 3,011; Referee: Mark Verso

August 15 21	Oakland Roots SC	1–1	Monterey Bay FC	Oakland, California
7:00 PM	Jacquesson 45'	Report	Gindiri 77'	Stadium: Oakland Coliseum; Attendance: 4,225; Referee: Abdou Ndiaye

August 22 22	Rhode Island FC	3–1	Monterey Bay FC	Pawtucket, Rhode Island
4:30 PM	Afonso 5'; Bacharach 66'; Stoneman 83'	Report	Lletget 16'	Stadium: Centreville Bank Stadium; Attendance: 10,606; Referee: Atahan Yaya

August 29 23	Monterey Bay FC	1–1	Sacramento Republic FC	Seaside, California
7:00 PM	Glasgow 44'	Report	Jennings 84'	Stadium: Cardinale Stadium; Attendance: 4,615; Referee: Corbyn May

September 5 24	Monterey Bay FC	1–1	Phoenix Rising FC	Seaside, California
7:00 PM	Nakamura 88'	Report	Flores 79'	Stadium: Cardinale Stadium; Attendance: 3,648; Referee: Elton García

September 19 25	Charleston Battery	1–0	Monterey Bay FC	Mount Pleasant, SC
7:00 PM	Sánchez 78'	Report		Stadium: Patriots Point Soccer Complex; Attendance: 4,373; Referee: Benjamin Meyer

September 26 26	Monterey Bay FC	2–3	Lexington SC	Seaside, California
7:00 PM	Farnsworth 5'; Otoya 85'; Egwu (yellow card) 55' (yellow-red card) 90'	Report	Firmino 1'; Goodrum 74'; Epps 80'	Stadium: Cardinale Stadium; Attendance: 3,182; Referee: Muhammad Hassan

October 3 27	Orange County SC	1–2	Monterey Bay FC	Irvine, CA
7:00 PM	Sylla 5' (pen.); Brewitt (red card) 45+1'	Report	Lletget 61' (pen.); Farnsworth 65'	Stadium: Championship Soccer Stadium; Attendance: 6,500; Referee: Matthew Thompson

October 10 28	New Mexico United	3–1	Monterey Bay FC	Albuquerque, New Mexico
6:00 PM	Dennis 18', 27'; Hurst 56'	Report	Lletget 58'	Stadium: Isotopes Park; Attendance: 10,003; Referee: Cristian Campo Hernández

October 17 29	Monterey Bay FC	0–1	Colorado Springs Switchbacks FC	Seaside, California
7:00 PM		Report	Tejada 28'	Stadium: Cardinale Stadium; Referee: Amin Hadzic

October 24 30	Monterey Bay FC	2–1	Las Vegas Lights FC	Seaside, California
7:00 PM	Glasgow 74'; Lletget 88'; Barajas (yellow card) 71' (yellow-red card) 90+3'	Report	Ybarra 79'	Stadium: Cardinale Stadium; Referee: Braeden Frey

=== USL Cup ===
Monterey Bay participated in the third edition of the USL Cup, the second edition to feature teams from both the USL Championship and League One.

==== Standings ====
Pos	Lg	Team	Pld	W	PKW	PKL	L	GF	GA	GD	Pts
2	USL1	AC Boise	4	2	1	0	1	8	6	+2	8
3	USLC	Sacramento Republic FC	4	2	1	0	1	6	3	+3	8
4	USLC	Oakland Roots SC	4	1	0	1	2	4	5	−1	4
5	USLC	Las Vegas Lights FC	4	1	0	1	2	4	6	−2	4
6	USLC	Monterey Bay FC	4	0	1	1	2	7	9	−2	3

==== Group stage ====
April 25 1	Monterey Bay FC	1–1 (4–3 p)	Oakland Roots SC	Seaside, California
7:00 p.m.	Paul 63'	Report	Kill 15'	Stadium: Cardinale Stadium; Attendance: 3,605; Referee: Kalilou Jarju
	Penalties
	Paul (penalty missed); Leggett (penalty scored); Glasgow (penalty scored); Joseph (penalty scored); Blancas (penalty missed); Gordon (penalty scored)		(penalty scored) de Vicente; (penalty missed) Wilson; (penalty missed) Prentice; (penalty scored) Tingey; (penalty scored) McCabe; (penalty missed) Elmasnaouy

May 16 2	Athletic Club Boise	4–3	Monterey Bay FC	Garden City, Idaho
7:00 PM	Kostyshyn 30'; Gasso 51'; Crull 55'; Amang 86'	Report	Blancas 9'; Leggett 20'; Nadje 34'	Stadium: Stadium at Expo Idaho; Attendance: 7,206; Referee: Muhammad Kaleia

June 6 3	Sacramento Republic FC	1–1 (5–3 p)	Monterey Bay FC	Sacramento, California
8:00 PM	Benítez 60' (pen.)	Report	Bidois 55'	Stadium: Heart Health Park; Attendance: 9,425; Referee: Calin Radosav
	Penalties
	Kaye (penalty scored); Benítez (penalty scored); Desmond (penalty scored); Malango (penalty scored); Spaulding (penalty scored)		(penalty scored) Blancas; (penalty missed) Paul; (penalty scored) Glasgow; (penalty scored) Leggett

July 11 4	Monterey Bay FC	2–3	Las Vegas Lights FC	Seaside, California
7:00 PM	Farnsworth 4'; Joseph 30'	Report	Okyere 71'; Anderson 85', 90+3'	Stadium: Cardinale Stadium; Attendance: 2,400; Referee: Ricardo Fierro
