= Mamadi Camara =

Mamadi Camara may refer to:

- Mamadi Camara (footballer, born 1995), Guinean football forward
- Mamadi Camará (footballer, born 2003), Bissau-Guinean football forward
