= Enric Bernat (footballer) =

Spanish footballer

Personal information
- Full name: Enric Bernat Lunar
- Date of birth: 22 November 1997 (age 28)
- Place of birth: Castellserà, Spain
- Height: 6 ft 2 in (1.88 m)
- Position: Midfielder

Youth career
- UE Tàrrega
- AE Josep Maria Gené

Senior career*
Years	Team	Apps	(Gls)
2017–2019	FC Ascó	46	(1)
2019–2020	Lleida Esportiu	3	(0)
2021	Toronto FC II	9	(0)
2022	FC Ascó	2	(0)
2022	Cerdanyola del Vallès FC	4	(0)
2023	CFJ Mollerussa	8	(0)
2023–2024	FC Vilafranca	16	(0)
2024–2025	CFJ Mollerussa	28	(2)
Total		116	(3)
- * Club domestic league appearances and goals as of 10 May 2025

Enric Bernat Lunar (born 22 November 1997) is a Spanish former footballer who played as a midfielder.

== Early career ==
In his youth, Bernat played with the UE Tàrrega and AE Josep Maria Gené youth systems.

== Club career ==
Bernat began his career with FC Ascó in the Tercera División, the Spanish fourth tier, where he played for two seasons, scoring one goal.

In 2019, he agreed to join CF Reus Deportiu B and was sent to Canada to trial with Major League Soccer club Toronto FC. He then returned to Spain, however, Reus was expelled from the Spanish league prior to the season, for failing to pay their reserve players and he became a free agent again.

Afterwards, he joined Lleida Esportiu of the third tier Segunda División B, on a contract until June 2021. After suffering a serious injury and payment issues, he departed the club.

In May 2021, he signed with Toronto FC II of USL League One. Due to the COVID-19 pandemic, he was forced to take a 17 day quarantine upon arriving in Canada, after which he was able to train for a week to the club, before undergoing another two-week quarantine after the team moved to Arizona in the United States, where they would play the season. He made his debut for Toronto FC II on 22 May 2021 against North Texas SC. He recorded his first assist on 2 June, on a goal by Kosi Thompson.

In January 2022, he returned to his former club FC Ascó, now in the fifth tier Tercera División RFEF.

In July 2022, he joined Cerdanyola del Vallès FC in the fourth tier Segunda Federación.

In January 2023, he joined CFJ Mollerussa in the sixth tier Primera Catalana.

In October 2023, he signed with Tercera Federación club FC Vilafranca.

In July 2024, he returned to CFJ Mollerussa, who had since promoted to the Tercera Federación.

== Post-playing career ==
In 2025, Bernat joined UAE First Division League side Hatta Club as a Tactical Analyst and Scout.

== Career statistics ==
As of 11 May 2025

Club	Season	League			Cup		Other		Total	
Club	Season	Division	Apps	Goals	Apps	Goals	Apps	Goals	Apps	Goals
FC Ascó	2017–18	Tercera División	16	1	0	0	–		16	1
FC Ascó	2018–19	Tercera División	30	0	2 (Note: Appearance(s) in the Copa Catalunya)	0	–		32	0
FC Ascó	Total		46	1	2	0	0	0	48	1
Lleida Esportiu	2019–20	Segunda División B	3	0	1	0	–		4	0
Toronto FC II	2021	USL League One	9	0	–		–		9	0
FC Ascó	2021–22	Tercera División RFEF	2	0	0	0	–		2	0
Cerdanyola del Vallès	2022–23	Segunda Federación	4	0	0	0	–		4	0
CFJ Mollerussa	2022–23	Primera Catalana	8	0	0	0	1 (Note: Appearance(s) in the Primera Catalana promotion playoffs)	0	9	0
FC Vilafranca	2023–24	Tercera Federación	16	0	0	0	0	0	16	0
CFJ Mollerussa	2024–25	Tercera Federación	28	2	0	0	1	0	29	2
Career total			116	3	3	0	2	0	121	3
