= Rohan Goulbourne =

Canadian soccer player

Personal information
- Full name: Rohan Marlon Anthony Goulbourne
- Date of birth: April 1, 2002 (age 24)
- Place of birth: Brampton, Ontario, Canada
- Height: 5 ft 7 in (1.70 m)
- Position: Defender

Youth career
- Woodbridge Strikers
- 2014–2021: Toronto FC

College career
Years	Team	Apps	(Gls)
2025–	Seneca Sting	6	(2)

Senior career*
Years	Team	Apps	(Gls)
2018	Toronto FC III	1	(0)
2021–2023	Toronto FC II	61	(0)
2024	UWA-Nedlands FC		

International career
2019	Canada U17	6	(0)
- * Club domestic league appearances and goals as of September 24, 2023

Rohan Marlon Anthony Goulbourne (born April 1, 2002) is a Canadian soccer player who plays as a defender.

== Early life ==
Goulbourne began playing Kinder Soccer in Brampton at age 3 and started playing for Woodbridge Strikers SC when he was six. In 2014, he joined the Toronto FC Academy. In 2020, he was set to attend Iowa Western Community College to play for their men's team.

== Club career ==
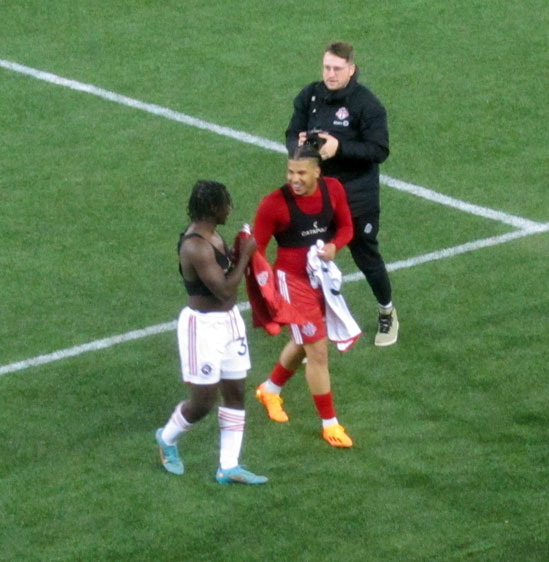
Nakye Greenidge-Duncan exchanges jerseys with Rohan Goulbourne in 2023

On September 18, 2018, he made his debut for the Toronto FC III in League1 Ontario against Vaughan Azzurri.

In December 2020, he signed his first professional contract with Toronto FC II of USL League One to join the team for the 2021 season. He made his debut for Toronto FC II on May 22, 2021 against North Texas SC.

In 2024, he played with Australian club UWA-Nedlands FC in the Football West State League Division One, scoring his first goal in a 4-0 victory over Rockingham City on May 18, 2024.

== International career ==
Goulbourne has represented the Canada U17 team at the 2019 CONCACAF U-17 Championship and the 2019 FIFA U-17 World Cup.

== Career statistics ==
As of September 24, 2023

Club	Season	League			Playoffs		Domestic Cup		Continental		Total	
Club	Season	Division	Apps	Goals	Apps	Goals	Apps	Goals	Apps	Goals	Apps	Goals
Toronto FC III	2018	League1 Ontario	1	0	–		–		–		1	0
Toronto FC II	2021	USL League One	22	0	–		–		–		22	0
Toronto FC II	2022	MLS Next Pro	22	0	2	0	–		–		24	0
Toronto FC II	2023	MLS Next Pro	17	0	–		–		–		17	0
Toronto FC II	Total		61	0	2	0	0	0	0	0	63	0
Career total			62	0	2	0	0	0	0	0	64	0
