= 2021 Toronto FC II season =

Toronto FC II
2021 season
- Owner: Maple Leaf Sports & Entertainment
- Manager: Mike Muñoz
- USL League One: 7th
- USL1 Playoffs: Did not qualify
- Top goalscorer: Garrett McLaughlin (8)
- Biggest win: TOR 3–0 NCA (10/1)
- Biggest defeat: GVL 3–0 TOR (9/3)

The 2021 Toronto FC II season was the seventh season in the club's history and sixth in play. The club returned to competition in USL League One after withdrawing from the 2020 season due to the COVID-19 pandemic. Due to COVID-19 travel restrictions in Canada, Toronto FC II would begin the season playing home matches in the United States, playing their first three home matches at Grande Sports World in Casa Grande, Arizona before relocating to Osceola Heritage Park in Kissimmee, Florida. They were able to return to playing home matches in Toronto on July 30.

== Team roster ==
As of September 25, 2021

No.	Pos.	Nation	Player
33	DF	CAN	Nyal Higgins (loaned to Atlético Ottawa)
34	DF	USA	Talen Maples
35	MF	CAN	Mehdi Essoussi
38	DF	CAN	Luca Petrasso
40	GK	USA	Caleb Patterson-Sewell
48	MF	CAN	Dante Campbell
49	FW	USA	Garrett McLaughlin
51	MF	CHI	Nicolas Ovalle Raffo (Note: Ovalle Raffo holds a U.S. Green Card, so he counts as a domestic player for roster purposes.)
52	MF	CAN	Kosi Thompson
58	DF	CAN	Kobe Franklin
60	GK	CAN	Brogan Engbers
62	MF	CAN	Rohan Goulbourne
64	DF	USA	Kevin Politz
65	DF	CAN	Antony Curic
68	MF	CAN	Nakye Greenidge-Duncan
70	GK	EST	Andreas Vaikla (Note: Vaikla has dual Canadian-Estonian nationality, so he counts as a domestic player for roster purposes.)
71	MF	ESP	Enric Bernat Lunar
72	MF	CAN	Steffen Yeates
73	MF	USA	Paul Rothrock
81	MF	CAN	Themi Antonoglou
82	MF	CAN	Julian Altobelli
83	FW	CAN	Hugo Mbongue
85	MF	CAN	Antonio Carlini
87	FW	CAN	Kwasi Poku
89	DF	CAN	Matthew Medeiros

Toronto FC Academy player

First team players who have been loaned to TFC II in 2021
No.	Position	Nation	Player
5	DF	CAN	Julian Dunn
7	FW	CAN	Jahkeele Marshall-Rutty
9	FW	VEN	Erickson Gallardo
11	FW	CAN	Jayden Nelson
14	MF	CAN	Noble Okello
24	FW	CAN	Jacob Shaffelburg
26/63	DF	TTO	Luke Singh (Note: Singh has dual Canadian-Trinidadian nationality, so he counts as a domestic player for roster purposes.)
77	FW	CAN	Jordan Perruzza
90	GK	USA	Kevin Silva
97	MF	CAN	Ralph Priso

== Coaching staff ==
As of January 27, 2020

Coaching staff
Head coach	(United States) Mike Muñoz
Assistant coach	(Canada) Chris Pozniak
Goalkeeping coach	(United States) Phil Boerger
Fitness coach	(Canada) Fabian Casal

== Competitions ==
=== USL League One ===
==== Standings ====
Pos	Team	Pld	W	D	L	GF	GA	GD	Pts	Qualification
5	Richmond Kickers	28	11	7	10	35	36	−1	40	Qualification for the play-offs
6	North Texas SC	28	10	10	8	40	32	+8	40	Qualification for the play-offs
7	Toronto FC II	28	10	8	10	34	32	+2	38	
8	New England Revolution II	28	11	4	13	33	39	−6	37	
9	Forward Madison FC	28	8	12	8	32	34	−2	36	

Source: USL League One
Rules for classification: 1) points; 2) total wins; 3) total goal differential; 4) total goals scored; 5) points earned against top four Conference finishers; 6) disciplinary points; 7) drawing of lots.

==== Match Results ====
May 22 1	Toronto FC II	2–1	North Texas SC	Casa Grande, Arizona
10:00 PM EDT	McLaughlin 45+1' (pen.), 51'; Yeates (yellow card) 67'; Mbongue (yellow card) 90'; Essoussi (yellow card) 90+3'	Report	Jacquel 45+4' (pen.); Alisson (yellow card) 65'; Bruce (yellow card) 88'	Stadium: Grande Sports World; Referee: Isaiah Vlad

May 26 2	Toronto FC II	1–2	FC Tucson	Casa Grande, Arizona
10:00 PM EDT	Antonoglou 37'	Report	Schenfeld (yellow card) 15'; Delgado 24'; Corfe 28'; Dennis (yellow card) 52'	Stadium: Grande Sports World; Referee: Samantha Martinez

May 29 3	North Texas SC	1–1	Toronto FC II	Arlington, Texas
5:30 PM EDT	Rayo (yellow card) 20'; Alisson (yellow card) 57'; Maldonado (yellow card) 80'; Bruce 90+6'	Report	Goulbourne (yellow card) 53'; McLaughlin 58'; Essoussi (yellow card) 88'	Stadium: Globe Life Park; Attendance: 2,212; Referee: Gerald Flores

June 2 4	Toronto FC II	1–1	Union Omaha	Casa Grande, Arizona
10:00 PM EDT	Thompson 49'; Franklin (yellow card) 67'	Report	Firmino (yellow card) 37'; Sousa (yellow card) 52'; Knutson 73'	Stadium: Grande Sports World; Referee: Jervis Atagana

June 5 5	FC Tucson	1–1	Toronto FC II	Tucson, Arizona
10:00 PM EDT	Gio Calixtro 21'; Schenfeld (yellow card) 38' (yellow-red card) 86'	Report	Antonoglou 16'; McLaughlin (yellow card) 78'	Stadium: Kino North Stadium; Attendance: 747; Referee: Héctor Hernández

June 9 6	Toronto FC II	0–1	South Georgia Tormenta FC	Kissimmee, Florida
7:00 PM EDT	Politz (yellow card) 44'; Priso (yellow card) 54'; Petrasso (yellow card) 82'	Report	O'Callaghan (yellow card) 34'; Micaletto (yellow card) 79', (goal) 88'	Stadium: Osceola Heritage Park; Referee: Alejo Calume

June 13 7	South Georgia Tormenta FC	1–0	Toronto FC II	Statesboro, Georgia
8:00 PM EDT	Thorn (yellow card) 26'; Kobe Perez 40'; Candela (yellow card) 51'; Nus (yellow card) 88'	Report	Curic (yellow card) 10'	Stadium: Erk Russell Park; Attendance: 923; Referee: Kyle Johnston

June 16 8	Fort Lauderdale CF	2–2	Toronto FC II	Fort Lauderdale, Florida
7:30 PM EDT	Evans 26'; Young (yellow card) 61'; Hundal 69'; Rosales (yellow card) 85'; Poplawski (yellow card) 86'	Report	McLaughlin 45+6'; Priso (yellow card) 52'; Nelson 81'; Altobelli (yellow card) 85'	Stadium: DRV PNK Stadium; Referee: Alyssa Nichols

June 19 9	Toronto FC II	2–1	Fort Lauderdale CF	Kissimmee, Florida
7:00 PM EDT	Marshall-Rutty 14'; Altobelli 20'; Priso (yellow card) 35'	Report	Penn 4'	Stadium: Osceola Heritage Park; Referee: Gabriele Giusti

June 23 10	Toronto FC II	3–1	South Georgia Tormenta FC	Kissimmee, Florida
7:00 PM EDT	Essoussi (yellow card) 18'; Singh (yellow card) 25', (goal) 61'; Nelson 65', 79'; Franklin (red card) 86'; Politz (yellow card) 88'	Report	Perek (yellow card) 39'; Micaletto (yellow card) 45'; Thorn (yellow card) 62'; Gómez (yellow card) 62'; Mueller 73'; O'Callaghan (yellow card) 90+5'; Liadi (yellow card) 90+7'	Stadium: Osceola Heritage Park; Referee: Alex Billeter

June 26 11	Fort Lauderdale CF	2–1	Toronto FC II	Fort Lauderdale, Florida
7:30 PM EDT	Penn 9'; Curry (yellow card) 84', (goal) 89'; Taghvai-Najib (yellow card) 90+3'	Report	Yeates (yellow card) 50'; McLaughlin 68' (pen.)	Stadium: DRV PNK Stadium; Referee: John Matto

June 30 12	South Georgia Tormenta FC	1–2	Toronto FC II	Statesboro, Georgia
8:00 PM EDT	Liadi (yellow card) 63'; Mayr-Fälten (yellow card) 65'; Michael 76'	Report	Antonio Carlini (yellow card) 34', (goal) 55'; Okello 45' (pen.); Nyal Higgins (yellow card) 61'; Nelson (yellow card) 90+1'	Stadium: Erk Russell Park; Attendance: 1,027; Referee: Kevin Broadley

July 9 13	New England Revolution II	1–0	Toronto FC II	Foxborough, Massachusetts
7:00 PM EDT	Rivera 46'; Rice (yellow card) 83'; Rozhansky (yellow card) 83'	Report	McLaughlin (yellow card) 87'	Stadium: Gillette Stadium; Attendance: 100; Referee: Christian Centeno

July 18 14	North Carolina FC	2–4	Toronto FC II	Cary, North Carolina
6:00 PM EDT	Martinez (yellow card) 9'; Simpson 26'; Pecka (red card) 34'; Flick (yellow card) 54'; Hamilton (yellow card) 56'; Frame 67'	Report	McLaughlin 23', 32', 83'; Carlini 75'; Maples (yellow card) 77'	Stadium: WakeMed Soccer Park; Attendance: 1,088; Referee: Alyssa Nichols

July 23 15	New England Revolution II	1–0	Toronto FC II	Foxborough, Massachusetts
7:00 PM EDT	Spaulding 68'; O'Hearn (yellow card) 80'; Rivera (yellow card) 82'	Report	Antonoglou (yellow card) 38'; Campbell (yellow card) 45+1'; Politz (yellow card) 90+2'	Stadium: Gillette Stadium; Attendance: 120; Referee: Ernie Constantine

July 30 16	Toronto FC II	0–0	Greenville Triumph SC	Toronto, Ontario
4:00 PM EDT	Thompson (yellow card) 82'; Campbell (yellow card) 84'	Report	Fricke (yellow card) 8' (yellow-red card) 39'; Ibarra (yellow card) 66'; Murillo (yellow card) 80'; Walker (yellow card) 83'	Stadium: BMO Training Ground; Referee: Brad Doubrough

August 6 17	Toronto FC II	2–1	Richmond Kickers	Toronto, Ontario
4:00 PM EDT	Monticelli 16' (o.g.); Carlini (yellow card) 18' (goal) 69'; Campbell (yellow card) 53'; Goulbourne (yellow card) 88'	Report	Vinyals 25' (pen.); Falck (yellow card) 52'; Aune (yellow card) 59'; Monticelli (yellow card) 90'	Stadium: BMO Training Ground; Referee: Scott Bowman

August 18 18	Forward Madison FC	2–2	Toronto FC II	Madison, Wisconsin
8:00 PM EDT	Molloy 11'; Pérez (yellow card) 43'; Gebhard 51'	Report	Altobelli 28', (yellow card) 45'; Petrasso (yellow card) 77'; Franklin 86'; Goulbourne (yellow card) 88'	Stadium: Breese Stevens Field; Attendance: 2,586; Referee: Nabil Bensalah

August 27 19	Toronto FC II	0–0	Chattanooga Red Wolves SC	Toronto, Ontario
4:00 PM EDT	Yeates (yellow card) 35'; Franklin (yellow card) 45+2'; Singh (yellow card) 59'	Report	Ramos (yellow card) 4'; Hernández (yellow card) 24'; Trilk (yellow card) 87'; Capozucchi (yellow card) 87'	Stadium: BMO Training Ground; Referee: Mario Alayass

September 3 20	Greenville Triumph SC	3–0	Toronto FC II	Greenville, South Carolina
7:00 PM EDT	Donnelly 4'; Walker 6', 68'; Booth (yellow card) 10'; Jaye (red card) 90+3'	Report	Marshall-Rutty (yellow card) 37'; Patterson-Sewell (yellow card) 55'	Stadium: Legacy Early College Field; Attendance: 2,016; Referee: Abdou Ndiaye

September 11 21	Union Omaha	2–1	Toronto FC II	Papillion, Nebraska
8:00 PM EDT	Boyce 6'; Scearce (yellow card) 21', (goal) 71'; Hurst (yellow card) 45+4'	Report	Carlini (yellow card) 39'; Singh 53'; Petrasso (yellow card) 59'; Altobelli (yellow card) 88'	Stadium: Werner Park; Attendance: 2,722; Referee: Adorae Monroy

September 17 22	Toronto FC II	1–1	Forward Madison FC	Toronto, Ontario
4:00 PM EDT	McLaughlin (yellow card) 27'; Campbell (yellow card) 84'; Antonoglou 88'; Carlini (yellow card) 90+3'	Report	Sierakowski (yellow card) 38', (goal) 41'; Fuson (yellow card) 89'	Stadium: BMO Training Ground; Referee: Aubrey Kotelko

September 25 23	Richmond Kickers	1–0	Toronto FC II	Richmond, Virginia
6:30 PM EDT	Vinyals (yellow card) 28'; Morán (yellow card) 35'; Crisler (yellow card) 79'; Terzaghi 90+3'; Anderson (yellow card) 90+5'	Report	Antonoglou (yellow card) 30'; Petrasso (yellow card) 73'	Stadium: City Stadium; Attendance: 2,223; Referee: Danielle Chesky

October 1 24	Toronto FC II	3–0	North Carolina FC	Toronto, Ontario
4:00 PM EDT	Franklin (yellow card) 23'; Curic (yellow card) 56'; Maples 65'; Petrasso 67'; Rothrock 73'	Report	Jackson (yellow card) 24'; Coan (yellow card) 69'; Flick (yellow card) 79'	Stadium: BMO Training Ground; Referee: Renzo Villanueva

October 8 25	Toronto FC II	1–0	New England Revolution II	Toronto, Ontario
4:00 PM EDT	Maples (yellow card) 4'; Politz 24'	Report	Freitas (yellow card) 39'; Buck (yellow card) 59'; Rice (yellow card) 86'; Quinones (yellow card) 89'	Stadium: BMO Training Ground; Referee: Michael Venne

October 16 26	Chattanooga Red Wolves SC	1–2	Toronto FC II	East Ridge, Tennessee
7:00 PM EDT	Galindrez 77'; Mentzingen (yellow card) 84'	Report	Rothrock 8', 47'	Stadium: CHI Memorial Stadium; Attendance: 2,119; Referee: William Steffen

October 22 27	Toronto FC II	1–2	Fort Lauderdale CF	Toronto, Ontario
4:00 PM EDT	Franklin 22'; Carlini (yellow card) 64'; Curic (yellow card) 69'	Report	Shaan Hundal 32', 54', (yellow card) 40'; Hardin (yellow card) 34'; Caputo (yellow card) 57'; Neville (yellow card) 87'; Beckham (yellow card) 89'; Cellender (yellow card) 90+1'	Stadium: BMO Training Ground; Referee: Seyed-Mohammad Mohseni

October 29 28	Toronto FC II	1–0	New England Revolution II	Toronto, Ontario
3:00 PM EDT	Rothrock 62'	Report	Maciel (yellow card) 36'; Buck (yellow card) 66'; Rozhansky (yellow card) 90+3'; Rice (red card) 90+4'	Stadium: BMO Training Ground; Referee: Michael Mund

== Statistics ==
=== Goals ===
Rank	Nation	Player	USL League One	Playoffs	Total
1	(United States)	Garrett McLaughlin	8	–	8
2	(United States)	Paul Rothrock	4	–	4
3	(Canada)	Themi Antonoglou	3	–	3
3	(Canada)	Antonio Carlini	3	–	3
3	(Canada)	Jayden Nelson	3	–	3
6	(Canada)	Julian Altobelli	2	–	2
6	(Trinidad and Tobago)	Luke Singh	2	–	2
6	(Canada)	Kobe Franklin	2	–	2
9	(United States)	Talen Maples	1	–	1
9	(Canada)	Jahkeele Marshall-Rutty	1	–	1
9	(Canada)	Noble Okello	1	–	1
9	(Canada)	Luca Petrasso	1	–	1
9	(United States)	Kevin Politz	1	–	1
9	(Canada)	Kosi Thompson	1	–	1
Own goals			1	–	1
Totals			34	0	34

Updated to match played October 29, 2021
Source: USL League One

=== Shutouts ===
Rank	Nation	Player	Pos.	USL League One	Playoffs	Total
1	(Estonia)	Andreas Vaikla	GK	2	–	2
1	(United States)	Caleb Patterson-Sewell	GK	2	–	2
3	(United States)	Kevin Silva	GK	1	–	1
Totals				5	0	5

Updated to match played October 29, 2021
