= Terique Mohammed =

Guyanese footballer (born 2000)

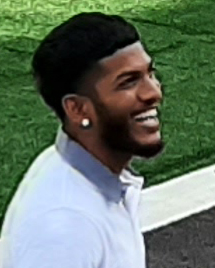
- Mohammed in 2021

Personal information
- Full name: Terique David Mohammed
- Date of birth: 27 January 2000 (age 26)
- Place of birth: Toronto, Ontario, Canada
- Height: 1.75 m (5 ft 9 in)
- Position: Left-back

Youth career
- Scarborough Blizzard SC
- Unionville Milliken SC
- 2016–2018: Toronto FC

College career
| Years | Team | Apps | (Gls) |
| 2026– | Humber Hawks | 0 | (0) |

Senior career*
| Years | Team | Apps | (Gls) |
| 2016–2018 | Toronto FC III | 13 | (2) |
| 2018–2020 | Toronto FC II | 30 | (2) |
| 2020 | → FC Edmonton (loan) | 5 | (0) |
| 2021 | Dundalk | 0 | (0) |
| 2021 | → Athlone Town (loan) | 0 | (0) |
| 2021 | → York United (loan) | 9 | (0) |
| 2022 | FC Edmonton | 22 | (0) |
| 2023 | Lexington SC | 22 | (0) |
| 2024 | Des Moines Menace | 0 | (0) |
| 2025 | Slingerz FC | | |
| 2026– | The Borough FC | 1 | (0) |

International career^{‡}
| 2018 | Canada U20 | 2 | (0) |
| 2024 | Guyana | 2 | (0) |
- * Club domestic league appearances and goals as of June 21, 2026 ‡ National team caps and goals as of 16 May 2024

Terique David Mohammed (born 27 January 2000) is a professional footballer who plays for The Borough FC in the Ontario Premier League 2. Born in Canada, he represented Guyana at international level.

== Early life ==
Mohammed began playing youth soccer at age three with Scarborough Blizzard SC. He later joined Unionville Milliken SC, before joining the Toronto FC Academy in 2016.

== Club career ==
In 2018, he played for Toronto FC III in League1 Ontario and Toronto FC II in the USL as an academy call-up. In September September 2018, he signed a professional contract with Toronto FC II for the 2019 season.

In August 2020, Mohammed was loaned to Canadian Premier League club FC Edmonton. He made his debut for Edmonton on 15 August against Forge FC. He was released by TFC II on 23 December 2020.

Mohammed signed for League of Ireland Premier Division club Dundalk in February 2021 and was sent out on loan to League of Ireland First Division side Athlone Town in order to gain experience. However, before the season would begin, Mohammed was recalled from loan by Dundalk due to concerns over a lack of playing time while at Athlone. However, due to his late recall he was unable to play a competitive fixture for Dundalk until July, although he did play in a friendly for Dundalk against Athlone on 27 April after which he began training with Canadian side Atletico Ottawa. Mohammed was loaned to York United on 3 June 2021. On 23 September, York announced that Mohammed's loan had been terminated. Prior to the 2022 season, new Dundalk coach Stephen O'Donnell would announce that Mohammed would not be in Dundalk's plans for the 2022 season.

In March 2022, Mohammed returned to FC Edmonton on a permanent contract.

Mohammed signed with USL League One expansion club Lexington SC on 27 January 2023. In May, he was named to the league's Team of the Week.

In 2024, he joined Des Moines Menace for their matches in the 2024 U.S. Open Cup.

In February 2025, he signed with Guyanese club Slingerz FC in the GFF Elite League.

== International career ==
In April 2017, Mohammed was named to the Canadian U17 side for the 2017 CONCACAF U-17 Championship. In October 2018, he was named to the U20 side for the 2018 CONCACAF U-20 Championship. Mohammed was named to the Canadian U-23 provisional roster for the 2020 CONCACAF Men's Olympic Qualifying Championship on 26 February 2020.

== Career statistics ==
As of match played 4 April 2024

Appearances and goals by club, season and competition
| Club | Season | League | | | National Cup | | Continental | | Total | |
| Club | Season | Division | Apps | Goals | Apps | Goals | Apps | Goals | Apps | Goals |
|---|---|---|---|---|---|---|---|---|---|---|
| Toronto FC II | 2018 | USL Championship | 10 | 0 | — | | — | | 10 | 0 |
| Toronto FC II | 2019 | USL League One | 20 | 2 | — | | — | | 20 | 2 |
| Toronto FC II | Total | | 30 | 2 | — | | — | | 30 | 2 |
| FC Edmonton (loan) | 2020 | Canadian Premier League | 5 | 0 | — | | — | | 5 | 0 |
| Dundalk | 2021 | LOI Premier Division | 0 | 0 | 0 | 0 | 0 | 0 | 0 | 0 |
| Athlone Town (loan) | 2021 | LOI First Division | 0 | 0 | — | | — | | 0 | 0 |
| York United (loan) | 2021 | Canadian Premier League | 9 | 0 | 0 | 0 | — | | 9 | 0 |
| FC Edmonton | 2022 | Canadian Premier League | 22 | 0 | 0 | 0 | — | | 22 | 0 |
| Lexington SC | 2023 | USL League One | 22 | 0 | 1 | 0 | — | | 23 | 0 |
| Des Moines Menace | 2024 | USL League Two | 0 | 0 | 1 | 0 | — | | 1 | 0 |
| Career Total | | | 88 | 2 | 2 | 0 | 0 | 0 | 90 | 2 |
