= Luke Singh =

Trinidadian footballer (born 2000)

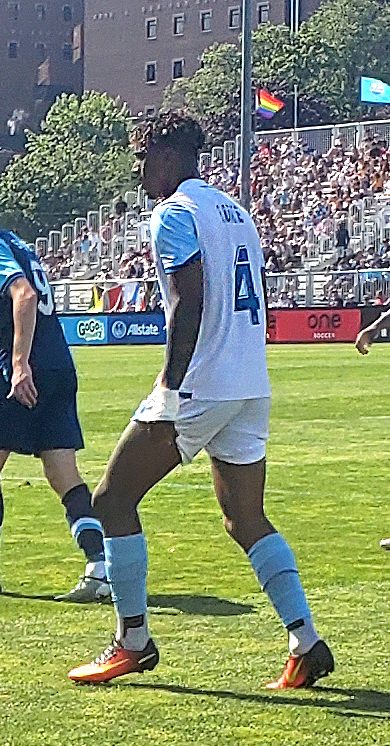
- Luke Singh in 2022 with FC Edmonton

Personal information
- Full name: Luke Adam Singh
- Date of birth: 12 September 2000 (age 26)
- Place of birth: Brampton, Ontario, Canada
- Height: 1.88 m (6 ft 2 in)
- Position: Defender

Team information
- Current team: Inter Toronto FC
- Number: 3

Youth career
- –2015: North Mississauga SC
- 2015: Brampton Youth SC
- 2016: Vaughan Azzurri
- 2017–2020: Toronto FC
- 2019: → Brøndby

Senior career*
Years	Team	Apps	(Gls)
2018	Toronto FC III	10	(1)
2019–2021	Toronto FC II	0	(0)
2019	→ Brøndby (loan)	0	(0)
2021	→ Toronto FC (loan)	0	(0)
2021–2024	Toronto FC	6	(1)
2021	→ Toronto FC II (loan)	7	(2)
2022	→ FC Edmonton (loan)	23	(0)
2023	→ Atlético Ottawa (loan)	25	(1)
2024	→ Atlético Ottawa (loan)	19	(0)
2025–	Inter Toronto FC (Note: York United FC changed its name to Inter Toronto FC in 2026)	46	(2)

International career^{‡}
2016	Trinidad and Tobago U17	2	(0)
2018	Trinidad and Tobago U20	3	(0)
2023–	Trinidad and Tobago	2	(0)
- * Club domestic league appearances and goals as of October 31, 2026 ‡ National team caps and goals as of July 3, 2023

Luke Adam Singh (born 12 September 2000) is a professional football player who plays as a defender for Inter Toronto FC of the Canadian Premier League. Born in Canada, he represents the Trinidad and Tobago national team.

== Early life ==
Singh played youth soccer with North Mississauga SC and the Brampton Youth SC. He also spent some time with the Team Ontario Provincial program. He later moved on to the Toronto FC Academy.

== Club career ==
After spending time in the Toronto FC Academy, he began playing for Toronto FC III in the semi-professional League1 Ontario in 2018. He scored his first goal on August 26 against North Mississauga SC. He went on trial with Danish club Brøndby at the beginning of 2019. He returned to Toronto at the end of January, after suffering an injury.

In March 2019, he signed a professional contract with Toronto FC II of USL League One. He immediately joined Brøndby IF in the Danish Superliga on loan, with whom he had trained earlier in the year until the end of 2019. He did not make any appearances with the first team, playing primarily with the Reserve team, with whom he scored two goals in 24 appearances, and the U19 team.

After Toronto FC II withdrew from the 2020 USL League One season due to the COVID-19 pandemic, Singh spent a large part of the season training with the first team. In April 2021, he signed a short-term non-MLS loan deal ahead of the club's CONCACAF Champions League match against Mexican side León, making his debut as a late game substitute in that match. He signed a second four-day deal on April 13, ahead of the second leg tie against León, making his first start in a 2–1 victory over the Mexican side. He signed an official first team deal on April 16. Singh scored his first goal for TFC on April 24 against Vancouver Whitecaps FC. He was loaned to the second team for some matches in 2021.

In February 2022, Singh was set to join Canadian Premier League side Pacific FC on loan as part of Toronto FC's transfer deal for Lukas MacNaughton, however, the loan ultimately did not proceed following further discussions between the clubs. Instead, the next month on March 3 Toronto announced Singh had joined FC Edmonton on loan for the 2022 CPL season. He made his debut for Edmonton on April 10, in the season-opener against Valour FC.

In March 2023, Singh was sent on a full season loan to Atlético Ottawa in the Canadian Premier League. Singh returned to Atlético Ottawa in March 2024 on loan for a second successive season. At the end of the 2024 season, Toronto FC declined his contract option for 2025.

On January 22, 2025, Singh signed with York United FC in the Canadian Premier League.

== International career ==
Singh is eligible to represent Canada, where he was born, and also Trinidad and Tobago, where both of his parents were born.

He attended the Canadian U15 Identification camp in 2014 and 2015.

He first represented the Trinidad and Tobago U17 team in the 2017 CONCACAF U-17 Championship qualifying tournament, playing two matches. He later represented the Trinidad and Tobago U20 team at the 2018 CONCACAF U-20 Championship.

Singh received his first senior call up to Trinidad and Tobago on May 28, 2021, for their World Cup qualifying matches, but three days later also accepted an invitation to join a Canadian training camp ahead of the same international window. He was to join Trinidad and Tobago following the Canadian camp, but on June 7 it was reported that Singh would remain with Canada after the Soca Warriors were eliminated from World Cup qualification.

In June 2023, Singh was named to Trinidad and Tobago's roster for the 2023 CONCACAF Gold Cup. He made his debut for the senior team on June 25, against Saint Kitts and Nevis in their opening match of the tournament.

== Career statistics ==
As of match played November 3, 2024

Appearances and goals by club, season and competition
Club	Season	League			Playoffs		National cup		Continental		Total	
Club	Season	Division	Apps	Goals	Apps	Goals	Apps	Goals	Apps	Goals	Apps	Goals
Toronto FC III	2018	League1 Ontario	10	1	–		–		–		10	1
Toronto FC II	2019	USL League One	0	0	–		–		–		0	0
Brøndby (loan)	2018–19	Danish Superliga	0	0	–		0	0	0	0	0	0
Brøndby (loan)	2019–20	Danish Superliga	0	0	–		0	0	0	0	0	0
Brøndby (loan)	Total		0	0	0	0	0	0	0	0	0	0
Toronto FC	2021	Major League Soccer	6	1	—		0	0	2	0	8	1
Toronto FC II (loan)	2021	USL League One	7	2	–		–		–		7	2
FC Edmonton (loan)	2022	Canadian Premier League	23	0	—		1	0	—		24	0
Atlético Ottawa (loan)	2023	Canadian Premier League	25	1	—		2	0	—		27	1
Atlético Ottawa (loan)	2024	Canadian Premier League	19	0	0	0	3	0	—		22	0
Atlético Ottawa (loan)	Total		44	1	0	0	5	0	0	0	49	1
Inter Toronto FC	2025	Canadian Premier League	24	0	2	0	3	0	—		29	0
Career total			114	5	2	0	9	0	2	0	127	5
