= Belmar Joseph =

Haitian footballer (born 2005)

Personal information
- Date of birth: 13 October 2005 (age 21)
- Place of birth: West Orange, New Jersey, United States
- Height: 1.88 m (6 ft 2 in)
- Position: Midfielder

Team information
- Current team: Monterey Bay FC (on loan from Sion)
- Number: 18

Youth career
- –2021: Cedar Stars Rush
- 2021–2022: Paris Saint-Germain
- 2022–2024: Cedar Stars Rush

College career
Years	Team	Apps	(Gls)
2023–2024	Villanova Wildcats	16	(1)
2024	NC State University		

Senior career*
Years	Team	Apps	(Gls)
2024–	Sion	3	(0)
2024–	Sion II	13	(1)
2026–	→ Monterey Bay	15	(0)

International career^{‡}
2024–	Haiti U20	6	(1)
2024–	Haiti	5	(0)
- * Club domestic league appearances and goals as of 18:49, 9 November 2026 (UTC) ‡ National team caps and goals as of 26 November 2024

Belmar Joseph (born 13 October 2005) is a footballer who plays as a midfielder for USL Championship club Monterey Bay FC on loan from FC Sion. Born in the United States, he is a Haiti international.

== Early life ==
Joseph was born on 13 October 2005 in West Orange, New Jersey, United States, where he grew up. At the age of thirteen, he moved with his family to Paris, France before returning to the United States one year later, where he attended St. Benedict's Preparatory School.

== Club career ==
As a youth player, Joseph joined the youth academy of French Ligue 1 side PSG. Following his stint there, he joined the youth academy of American side Cedar Stars Rush, where he started his senior career. In 2024, he signed for Swiss side Sion after playing for the Villanova Wildcats, the soccer team of Villanova University in the United States.

On January 16, 2026, it was announced that Belmar would join Monterey Bay FC on loan for the 2026 USL Championship season.

== International career ==
Joseph played for the Haiti national under-20 football team for 2024 CONCACAF U-20 Championship qualifying, helping the team achieve qualification to the 2024 CONCACAF U-20 Championship. The same year, he played for the Haiti national football team in the UEFA Nations League.

== Style of play ==
Joseph plays as a midfielder and is known for his work ethics. Haitian news website Haiti-Tempo wrote that his "main quality lies in his ability to multiply high-intensity runs, which makes him an English box-to-box midfielder".
