= Cale Loughrey =

Canadian soccer player (born 2001)

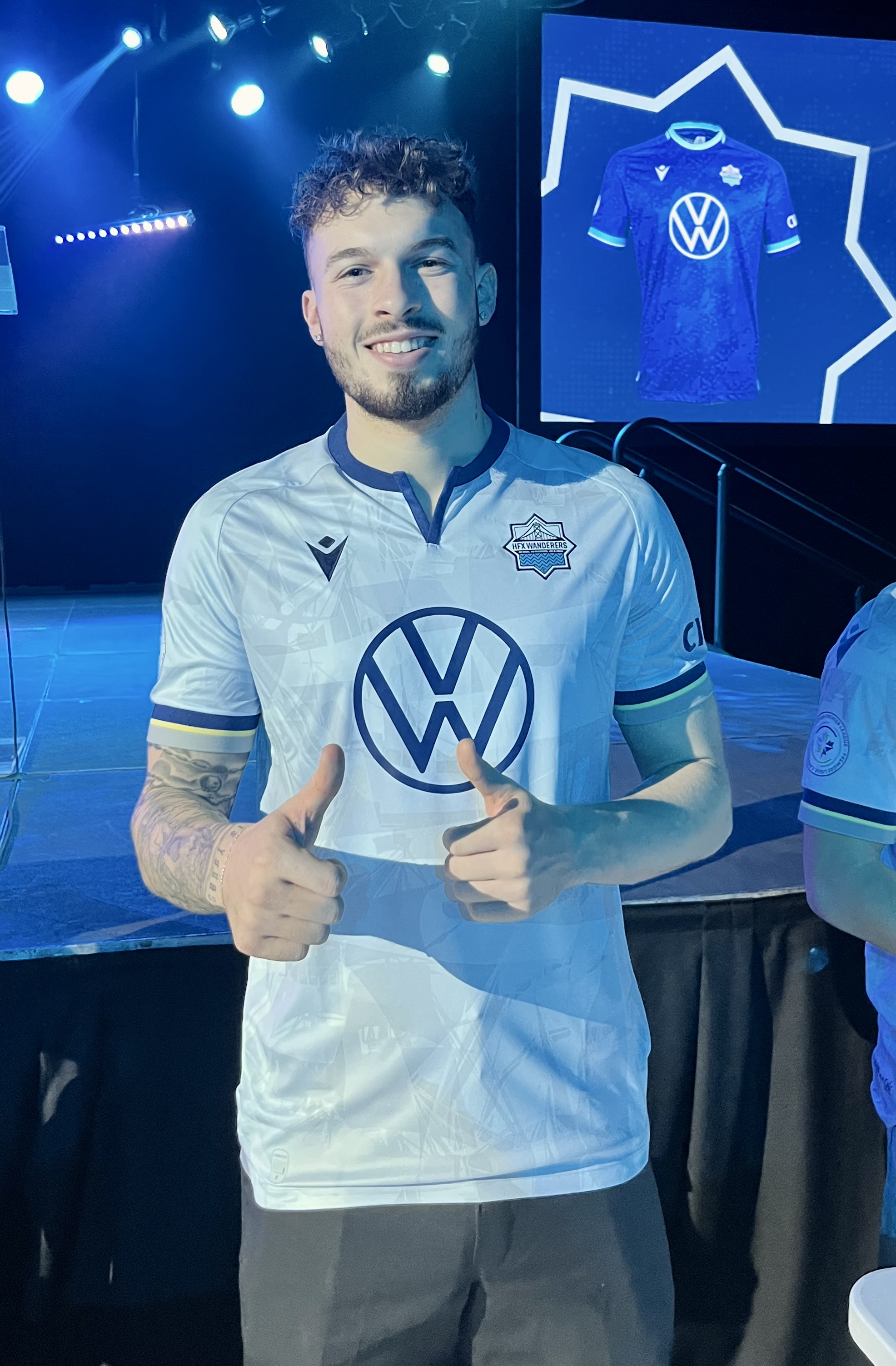
- Loughrey at a Halifax Wanderers fan event in 2024

Personal information
- Date of birth: August 4, 2001 (age 25)
- Place of birth: Toronto, Ontario, Canada
- Height: 1.93 m (6 ft 4 in)
- Position: Centre-back

Team information
- Current team: Partick Thistle
- Number: 22

Youth career
- Richmond Hill SC
- Whitby FC
- Unionville Milliken SC

College career
Years	Team	Apps	(Gls)
2019	Seneca Sting	7	(5)
2020–2021	UAB Blazers	25	(1)

Senior career*
Years	Team	Apps	(Gls)
2018	Darby FC	7	(0)
2019	Unionville Milliken SC	13	(1)
2022	Forge FC	0	(0)
2022	→ FC Edmonton (loan)	24	(0)
2023–2024	HFX Wanderers	41	(1)
2025	Corvinul Hunedoara	7	(0)
2025–2026	Hamilton Academical	19	(0)
2026–	Partick Thistle	24	(2)
- * Club domestic league appearances and goals as of 18:37, 21 November 2026 (UTC)

Cale Loughrey (/lɒkˈriː/ LOCK-ree, born August 4, 2001) is a Canadian Scottish professional soccer player who plays as a centre-back for Scottish Championship club Partick Thistle

== Early life ==
Loughrey was born in Toronto, Ontario, Canada to a Scottish father (originally from Clydebank, West Dunbartonshire) and a Canadian mother; he also holds a British passport.

== College career ==
In 2019, he attended Seneca College, playing for the men's soccer team. In his only season with Seneca, he was named team captain and MVP. He was also named an OCAA East Division First-Team All-Star.

In 2020, he moved to the University of Alabama at Birmingham, playing for the men's soccer team. He scored his first goal on September 26, 2020, against the Georgia Southern Eagles. He was named a Conference USA Third Team All Star for the 2020–21 season.

== Club career ==
=== League1 Ontario ===
In 2018, Loughrey played for Darby FC in League1 Ontario.

In early 2019, he trained with Canadian Premier League club York9 FC. In 2019, he played for Unionville Milliken SC in League1 Ontario, scoring his first goal on June 22 against Aurora FC. He played in the CPL U21 showcase match for Team Ontario being named MVP.

=== Canadian Premier League ===
In February 2022, he signed a contract with Forge FC of the Canadian Premier League. He made his debut on February 16 in a CONCACAF Champions League match against Mexican side Cruz Azul.

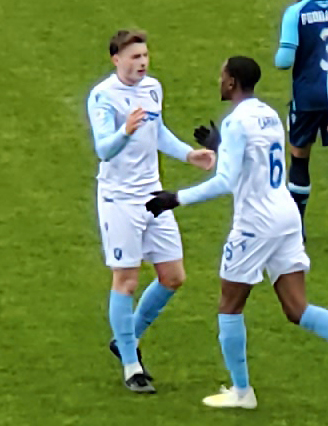
Loughrey with FC Edmonton in 2022

On March 30, 2022, he was loaned to fellow CPL club FC Edmonton. He made 25 appearances for Edmonton across all competitions, becoming a free agent at the end of the season, upon the expiry of his contract.

In February 2023, he signed a contract with the HFX Wanderers of the Canadian Premier League. He was named to the CPL Team of the Week twice in the 2023 season. After the season, the club picked up his option for the 2024 season. He scored his first professional goal on July 18, 2024 against Valour FC. He departed the club after the 2024 season.

=== Romania ===
On January 27, 2025, Loughrey signed with Romanian Liga II club Corvinul Hunedoara.

=== Scotland ===
On August 2, 2025, he joined Scottish League One club Hamilton Academical, following a successful trial period; he signed a one-year amateur contract, due to the transfer embargo imposed to the club by the SPFL for repeatedly failing to settle their tax obligations. He made his debut for Hamilton later the same day, starting in a 2–0 league win over Montrose.

On January 13, 2026, Loughrey signed an 18 month contract with Scottish Championship club Partick Thistle. On the same day, Loughrey made his Thistle debut and scored his first goal for the club in a Scottish Challenge Cup tie with Inverness Caledonian Thistle.

== Career statistics ==
As of match played 7 November 2026

Appearances and goals by club, season and competition
Club	Season	League			Playoffs		National cup (Note: Includes Canadian Championship, Scottish Cup)		League cup (Note: Includes Scottish League Cup)		Continental		Other		Total	
Club	Season	Division	Apps	Goals	Apps	Goals	Apps	Goals	Apps	Goals	Apps	Goals	Apps	Goals	Apps	Goals
Darby FC	2018	League1 Ontario	7	0	1	0	—		—		—		0	0	8	0
Unionville Milliken SC	2019	League1 Ontario	13	1	—		—		—		—		—		13	1
Forge FC	2022	Canadian Premier League	0	0	0	0	0	0	—		1 (Note: Appearance in CONCACAF Champions League)	0	—		1	0
FC Edmonton (loan)	2022	Canadian Premier League	24	0	—		1	0	—		—		—		25	0
HFX Wanderers	2023	Canadian Premier League	24	0	1	0	0	0	—		—		—		25	0
HFX Wanderers	2024	Canadian Premier League	17	1	—		1	0	—		—		—		18	1
HFX Wanderers	Total		41	1	1	0	0	0	—		0	0	0	0	43	1
Corvinul Hunedoara	2024–25	Liga II	7	0	—		—		—		—		—		7	0
Hamilton Academical	2025–26	Scottish League One	19	0	—		5	0	0	0	—		0	0	24	0
Partick Thistle	2025–26	Scottish Championship	10	1	3	0	0	0	0	0	—		1 (Note: Appearance in Scottish Challenge Cup)	1	14	2
Partick Thistle	2026–27	Scottish Championship	12	0	0	0	0	0	5	0	—		2	0	19	0
Partick Thistle	Total		22	1	3	0	0	0	5	0	0	0	3	1	33	2
Career total			123	3	5	0	7	0	5	0	1	0	3	1	139	4
