= Kairo Coore =

Former Professional Canadian soccer player (born 2001)

Personal information
- Date of birth: January 12, 2001 (age 25)
- Place of birth: Ajax, Ontario Canada
- Height: 1.85 m (6 ft 1 in)
- Position: Forward

Youth career
- Ajax SC
- Erin Mills Eagles

College career
Years	Team	Apps	(Gls)
2019–2020	Saginaw Valley State Cardinals	25	(13)
2021–2022	CBU Capers	22	(21)
2024–	Ontario Tech Ridgebacks	8	(8)

Senior career*
Years	Team	Apps	(Gls)
2022	FC Edmonton	10	(2)
2023	Western Suburbs FC	17	(10)
2024	Whittlesea Ranges FC	15	(11)
- * Club domestic league appearances and goals as of July 19, 2024

Kairo Coore (born January 12, 2001) is a Canadian soccer player.

== Early life ==
Coore began playing soccer at age four with Ajax SC, later joining Erin Mills SC.

== College career ==
In 2019, he began attending Saginaw Valley State University, playing for the men's soccer team. In 2019, he had nine goals and five assists, ranking third in the conference in goals and fifth in points, while in 2020 season, Coore scored four goals and three assists in six games.

In 2021, he returned to Canada, joining Cape Breton University. He chose to return to Canada, as he felt being eligible for the CPL-U Sports Draft would improve his chances of a professional career. He scored four goals in a match against the Acadia Axemen on September 26, earning AUS male athlete of the week honours. In his first season for the Capers, he led the nation with 15 goals, also adding one assist, in 12 games. He was named an AUS First Team All-star and was named MVP of the 2021 AUS Championship, helping the Capers win the conference title. He was also named a Second Team All-Canadian.

In 2024, he began attending Ontario Tech University, where he played for the men's soccer team. He scored his first goal in his debut on August 30 against the Queen's Golden Gaels. He was named the school's Athlete of the Week twice in September. At the end of the season, he was named the OUA East MVP and an OUA East First Team All-Star. and a U Sports First Team All-Canadian.

== Club career ==
Coore was selected second overall by Canadian Premier League club FC Edmonton in the 2022 CPL-U Sports Draft. In March, he signed a developmental contract with the club for the 2022 season. He made his debut on April 10, in a substitute appearance against Valour FC. He scored his first professional goal on May 31 against Forge FC. In August, he departed the club, returning to university, as part of his developmental contract.

In February 2023, he joined New Zealand Central League club Western Suburbs FC, via their partnership with Olé Football Academy.

In 2024, he played with the Whittlesea Ranges FC in the Australian sixth tier Victorian State League 2.

== Career statistics ==
As of match played July 19, 2024

Club statistics
Club	Season	League			Playoffs		Domestic Cup		Continental		Total	
Club	Season	Division	Apps	Goals	Apps	Goals	Apps	Goals	Apps	Goals	Apps	Goals
FC Edmonton	2022	Canadian Premier League	10	2	—		1	0	—		11	2
Western Suburbs FC	2023	Central League	17	10	—		2	0	—		19	10
Whittlesea Ranges FC	2024	Victorian State League 2 Northwest	15	11	—		0	0	—		15	11
Career total			42	23	0	0	3	0	0	0	45	23
