= Felix N'sa =

Canadian soccer player (born 2003)

Personal information
- Date of birth: September 25, 2003 (age 23)
- Place of birth: Montreal, Quebec, Canada
- Height: 1.75 m (5 ft 9 in)
- Position: Defender

Youth career
- CS Panellinios

Senior career*
Years	Team	Apps	(Gls)
2021–2022	York United	0	(0)
2022	→ FC Edmonton (loan)	1	(0)
2024	Thunder Bay Chill	6	(0)
- * Club domestic league appearances and goals as of July 8, 2024

Felix N'sa (born September 25, 2003) is a Canadian soccer player.

== Early life ==
N'sa played youth soccer with CS Panellinios. In 2020, he went on trial with Pacific FC of the Canadian Premier League.

== Club career ==
In November 2020, he signed a multi-year professional contract, beginning in the 2021 season, with York United FC of the Canadian Premier League. However, he suffered an injury during pre-season, which caused him to miss the entire 2021 season. In February 2022, he went on loan to fellow CPL club FC Edmonton. After still rehabbing from his previous injury upon his arrival to Edmonton, he made his professional debut on October 8, 2022, against Valour FC. At the conclusion of the season, York declined N'sa's option for the 2023 season.

In March 2024, he joined the Thunder Bay Chill in USL League Two.

== Personal life ==
He is the younger brother of Chrisnovic N'sa, who is also a professional soccer player.

== Career statistics ==
As of July 8, 2024
Club	Season	League			Playoffs		Cup		Total	
Club	Season	Division	Apps	Goals	Apps	Goals	Apps	Goals	Apps	Goals
York United	2021	Canadian Premier League	0	0	0	0	0	0	0	0
FC Edmonton (loan)	2022	Canadian Premier League	1	0	—		0	0	1	0
Thunder Bay Chill	2024	USL League Two	6	0	0	0	—		6	0
Career Total			7	0	0	0	0	0	7	0
