= Ilijah Paul =

American soccer player (born 2002)

Personal information
- Full name: Ilijah Paul Gindiri
- Date of birth: July 26, 2002 (age 24)
- Place of birth: Gilbert, Arizona, United States
- Height: 6 ft 0 in (1.83 m)
- Position: Forward

Team information
- Current team: Monterey Bay FC
- Number: 20

Youth career
- San Tan Legacy
- Arizona SC
- Valparaiso United
- 2018–2019: Real Salt Lake
- 2019: Phoenix Rising
- 2019–2020: Barça Residency Academy

College career
Years	Team	Apps	(Gls)
2020–2021	San Francisco Dons	1	(0)
2021–2022	Washington Huskies	39	(11)

Senior career*
Years	Team	Apps	(Gls)
2019	Phoenix Rising	0	(0)
2019	→ FC Tucson (loan)	3	(0)
2022	Crossfire Redmond	6	(3)
2023–2024	Real Salt Lake	7	(0)
2023–2024	Real Monarchs	30	(8)
2023	→ Larne (loan)	4	(0)
2024	→ Ventura County FC (loan)	7	(2)
2025–	Monterey Bay FC	49	(9)
- * Club domestic league appearances and goals as of October 31, 2026

Ilijah Paul Gindiri (born July 26, 2002) is an American soccer player who plays as a forward for USL Championship club Monterey Bay FC.

== Career ==
=== Youth and college ===
Paul played soccer for a variety of clubs at youth level, spending time with local sides San Tan Legacy and Arizona Soccer Club, before joining Valparaiso United FC, helping the team to end a fifteen-year title drought for Arizona teams at the U.S. Youth Soccer National Championships. In 2018, he left Arizona to join the Real Salt Lake academy in Utah. In for the U16/17 side, Paul made sixteen appearances and led the team with ten goals. 2019 saw Paul join the Phoenix Rising academy, but also sign a USL academy contract that allowed him to retain his college eligibility. In September 2019, he was loaned to Phoenix's USL League One affiliate side FC Tucson, where he made three appearances. In late 2019, Paul joined his final academy side, the Barça Residency Academy, scoring six goals in as many appearances.

In 2020, Paul committed to playing college soccer at the University of San Francisco. During the 2020–21 season, which was truncated by the COVID-19 pandemic, Paul only made a single appearance for the Dons. In 2021, Paul transferred to the University of Washington, where he went on to score 11 goals and tallying five assists in 39 appearances for the Huskies. In his sophomore season, he was a MAC Hermann Trophy Semifinalist, Pac-12 Offensive Player of the Year, Pac-12 All-Conference First Team, and United Soccer Coaches All-Far West Region First Team.

During the 2022 season, Paul also played with National Premier Soccer League side Crossfire Redmond, scoring three goals in six games.

In December 2022, it was announced that Paul would leave college early and sign a Generation Adidas contract with Major League Soccer, and enter the 2023 MLS SuperDraft.

=== Senior ===
On December 21, 2022, Paul was selected 7th overall in the 2023 MLS SuperDraft by Real Salt Lake.

Paul joined Monterey Bay FC of the USL Championship on February 3, 2025.

== Honours ==
Larne

NIFL Premiership: 2023-24
