= Nyal Higgins =

Canadian soccer player (born 1998)

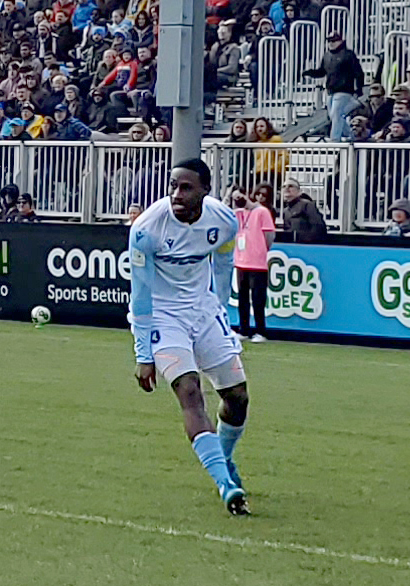
- Higgins in 2022 with FC Edmonton

Personal information
- Full name: Nyal Christian-Anthony Higgins
- Date of birth: January 19, 1998 (age 28)
- Place of birth: Ajax, Ontario, Canada
- Height: 1.88 m (6 ft 2 in)
- Position: Centre-back

Team information
- Current team: Vaughan Azzurri

Youth career
- Ajax SC
- Vaughan SC

College career
Years	Team	Apps	(Gls)
2016–2018	Oakland Golden Grizzlies	49	(4)
2019	Syracuse Orange	19	(1)

Senior career*
Years	Team	Apps	(Gls)
2016	Vaughan Azzurri	5	(0)
2017	Michigan Bucks	8	(0)
2018	Vaughan Azzurri	3	(0)
2020–2021	Toronto FC II	9	(0)
2020	→ Nyköpings BIS (loan)	17	(1)
2021	→ Atlético Ottawa (loan)	8	(0)
2022	FC Edmonton	24	(0)
2023	Vaughan Azzurri	18	(0)
2024–2025	York United FC	32	(1)
2026–	Vaughan Azzurri	1	(0)
- * Club domestic league appearances and goals as of October 27, 2025

Nyal Christian-Anthony Higgins (born January 19, 1998) is a Canadian professional soccer player who plays as a centre-back for Vaughan Azzurri in the Ontario Premier League.

== College ==
In 2016, he attended Oakland University, playing for the Golden Grizzlies soccer team. As a freshman, he was named to the Horizon League All-Freshman Team and the NSCAA All-Great Lakes Regional Third Team. In his sophomore and junior seasons, he was named to the All-Horizon League Second Team.

In 2019, he transferred to Syracuse University to play for the Syracuse Orange soccer team.

== Club career ==
During the 2016 and 2018 seasons, he played with Vaughan Azzurri in League1 Ontario. In 2017, he played with the Michigan Bucks in the Premier Development League.

In 2018, he trained with three Major League Soccer clubs - Sporting Kansas City, Columbus Crew SC, and Nashville SC. He later trained with Toronto FC in 2019.

He was selected 19th overall by Toronto FC in the 2020 MLS SuperDraft. He attended pre-season with the club, but ultimately did not make the final roster for 2020. In July, he signed a USL contract with the second-team Toronto FC II.

He was soon after sent on loan to Nyköpings BIS in the Swedish third tier, following TFC II's withdrawal from the 2020 USL League One season due to the COVID-19 pandemic. He scored his first goal on November 21, in a 7-1 defeat to IF Brommapojkarna. He made his debut for Toronto FC II on May 22, 2021 against North Texas SC.

In August 2021, Higgins joined Canadian Premier League side Atlético Ottawa on loan. He made his debut in a substitute appearance, on August 25, against Forge FC.

In February 2022, he signed a contract with FC Edmonton in the Canadian Premier League. In 2023, he returned to Vaughan Azzurri. He was named a league Second Team All-Star at the end of the season.

In April 2024, he signed a one-year contract with a club option for 2025 with York United FC in the Canadian Premier League. He scored his first CPL goal on September 6, 2024, in a 1-0 victory over Vancouver FC. At the end of the 2024 season, the club picked up his option for 2025.

== International career ==
He was a member of the U-18 and U-20 Canada national team talent pools.

== Career statistics ==
As of match played on October 27, 2025

Club	Season	League			Playoffs		Domestic Cup		League Cup		Total	
Club	Season	Division	Apps	Goals	Apps	Goals	Apps	Goals	Apps	Goals	Apps	Goals
Vaughan Azzurri	2016	League1 Ontario	5	0	0	0	—		?	0	5	0
Michigan Bucks	2017	PDL	8	0	1	0	0	0	—		9	0
Vaughan Azzurri	2018	League1 Ontario	3	0	0	0	—		0	0	3	0
Toronto FC II	2021	USL League One	9	0	—		—		—		9	0
Nyköpings BIS (loan)	2020	Ettan Norra	17	1	—		2	0	—		19	1
Atlético Ottawa (loan)	2021	Canadian Premier League	8	0	—		0	0	—		8	0
FC Edmonton	2022	Canadian Premier League	24	0	—		1	0	—		25	0
Vaughan Azzurri	2023	League1 Ontario	18	0	2	0	1	0	—		21	0
York United FC	2024	Canadian Premier League	16	1	2	0	1	0	—		19	0
York United FC	2025	Canadian Premier League	16	0	0	0	2	0	—		18	0
York United FC	Total		32	1	2	0	3	0	0	0	37	1
Career total			124	2	5	0	7	0	0	0	136	1
