= Kelsey Egwu =

Canadian soccer player (born 2004)

Personal information
- Full name: Kelsey Uchenna Egwu
- Date of birth: February 1, 2004 (age 22)
- Place of birth: Toronto, Ontario, Canada
- Height: 6 ft 5 in (1.96 m)
- Positions: Centre-back; full-back

Team information
- Current team: Monterey Bay FC
- Number: 25

Youth career
- St. Albert Impact FC
- Edmonton Strikers SC
- BTB Academy

College career
Years	Team	Apps	(Gls)
2022	MacEwan Griffins	11	(0)

Senior career*
Years	Team	Apps	(Gls)
2022	FC Edmonton	1	(0)
2023	FC London	20	(0)
2023	Toronto FC II	0	(0)
2024–2025	Narva Trans	25	(0)
2024	→ Narva Trans U21	9	(0)
2025	→ Valour FC (loan)	23	(3)
2026–	Monterey Bay FC	24	(0)
- * Club domestic league appearances and goals as of 18:50, 9 November 2026 (UTC)

Kelsey Uchenna Egwu (born February 1, 2004) is a Canadian soccer player who plays as a centre-back or full-back for Monterey Bay FC in the USL Championship.

== Early life ==
Egwu is of Nigerian descent and was born in Toronto in Canada, before moving to Nigeria. In 2015, he moved back to Canada, this time in Edmonton. Egwu played youth soccer with St. Albert Impact FC, Edmonton Strikers and BTB Academy. In 2021, he had a training stint with Pacific FC of the Canadian Premier League. He played for Team Alberta at the 2022 Canada Summer Games.

== University career ==
In 2022, he began attending MacEwan University, where he played for the men's soccer team.

== Club career ==
On April 30, 2022, Egwu signed a U18 developmental contract with FC Edmonton of the Canadian Premier League. He made his debut on May 14, playing the full 90 against Pacific FC.

In February 2023, he joined FC London in League1 Ontario. After the League1 Ontario season, he began training with MLS Next Pro side Toronto FC II and served as an unused substitute in the final match of the 2023 season against Crown Legacy FC.

On February 24, 2024, following a successful trial with Estonian club JK Narva Trans, Egwu signed a two-year contract with the club, with an option for 2026. In February 2025, Egwu went on loan to Canadian Premier League club Valour FC. He scored his first goal for Valour on May 10, 2025 against Atlético Ottawa.

In December 2025, he signed a two-year contract with USL Championship club Monterey Bay FC for the 2026 and 2027 seasons.

== Career statistics ==
As of June 21, 2026

Club	League	Season	League		National Cup		Other		Total	
Club	League	Season	Apps	Goals	Apps	Goals	Apps	Goals	Apps	Goals
FC Edmonton	2022	Canadian Premier League	1	0	0	0	—		1	0
FC London	2023	League1 Ontario	20	0	—		—		20	0
Toronto FC II	2023	MLS Next Pro	0	0	—		—		0	0
JK Narva Trans	2024	Meistriliiga	25	0	2	0	1 (Note: Appearances in Estonian Supercup)	0	28	0
JK Narva Trans U21	2024	Esiliiga B	9	0	—		—		9	0
Valour FC (loan)	2025	Canadian Premier League	23	3	3	0	—		26	3
Monterey Bay FC	2026	USL Championship	12	0	0	0	2	0	14	0
Career total			90	3	2	0	3	0	95	3
