= Mamadi Camara (soccer, born 1995) =

Soccer player (born 1995)

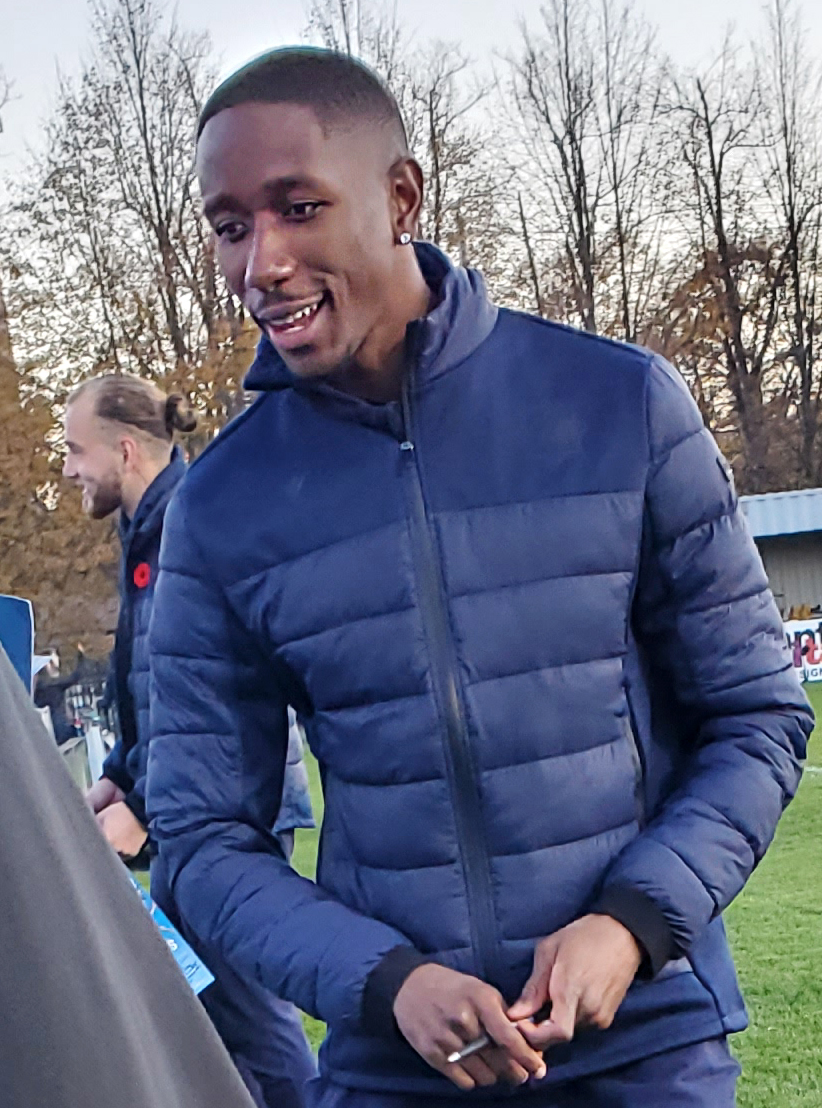
- Camara in 2021

Personal information
- Date of birth: 25 February 1995 (age 31)
- Place of birth: Guinea
- Height: 1.91 m (6 ft 3 in)
- Positions: Attacking midfielder; forward

Youth career
- CS Longueuil

College career
Years	Team	Apps	(Gls)
2015–2018	Simon Fraser Clan	69	(29)

Senior career*
Years	Team	Apps	(Gls)
2014–2015	CS Longueuil	11	(3)
2017	TSS FC Rovers	8	(2)
2018	Calgary Foothills	8	(0)
2019	CS St-Hubert	4	(3)
2020	Colorado Springs Switchbacks	14	(1)
2021	Celtix du Haut-Richelieu	10	(11)
2021	HFX Wanderers	10	(1)
2022	FC Edmonton	26	(4)
- * Club domestic league appearances and goals as of 8 October 2022

Mamadi Camara (born 25 February 1995) is a professional soccer player who plays as a forward.

He was born in Guinea and raised in Canada.

== Early life ==
Mamadi Camara was born in Guinea, before moving to Montreal in Canada aged four-years old.

Camara played four seasons of university soccer at NCAA Division II Simon Fraser University in the Great Northwest Athletic Conference between 2015 and 2018, where he made 69 appearances, scoring 29 goals and tallying 20 assists. Over his four years for SFU, he was named to the GNAC first all-star team each year, the All-West team in his final three years, and GNAC player of the year in his senior season.

== Club career ==
While at university, Camara played in the Première Ligue de soccer du Québec with CS Longueuil in 2014 and 2015. In 2016, during his summer break, he was invited to train with Whitecaps FC 2, the second team of Major League Soccer club Vancouver Whitecaps FC. In 2017, he joined USL PDL club TSS FC Rovers and then in the following year, he joined Calgary Foothills. In 2019, he played with PLSQ club CS St-Hubert. Afterwards, he returned to B.C., and joined amateur side Surrey Central City Breakers FC, helping them win the 2019 Challenge Trophy as national champions.

Prior to the 2019 MLS SuperDraft, Camara was one of six Canadians, and the only NCAA Division II player, invited to the MLS Combine. On 11 January 2019, Camara was selected 46th overall in the 2019 MLS SuperDraft by San Jose Earthquakes. He became the first player who played in the PLSQ to be drafted into the MLS. However, he did not sign with the club.

On 17 December 2019, Camara joined USL Championship side Colorado Springs Switchbacks ahead of their 2020 season. He scored his first professional goal on 16 September against El Paso Locomotive.

In 2021, he returned to the semi-professional PLSQ with Celtix du Haut-Richelieu, where he scored 11 goals in 10 matches. He was leading the league in scoring with 11 goals in 10 matches, at the time he departed the club for a professional opportunity.

On 1 September 2021, he signed with HFX Wanderers FC of the Canadian Premier League for the remainder of the 2021 season. In his second appearance, on 6 September against York United FC, he was nearly credited with his first goal, after his header hit the crossbar then deflected off a defender into the goal, ultimately being ruled an own goal. He scored his first CPL goal on 3 October against York. He departed the club at the end of the season.

In February 2022, Camara signed with FC Edmonton.

== Career statistics ==
As of 8 October 2022

Appearances and goals by club, season and competition
Club	Season	League			Playoffs		National cup		League cup		Total	
Club	Season	Division	Apps	Goals	Apps	Goals	Apps	Goals	Apps	Goals	Apps	Goals
CS Longueuil	2014	Première Ligue de soccer du Québec	2	0	—		—		0	0	2	0
CS Longueuil	2015	Première Ligue de soccer du Québec	9	3	—		—		2	0	11	3
Vancouver TSS FC Rovers	2017	Premier Development League	8	2	—		—		—		8	2
Calgary Foothills FC	2018	Premier Development League	8	0	0	0	—		—		8	0
CS St-Hubert	2019	Première Ligue de soccer du Québec	4	3	—		—		0	0	4	3
Colorado Springs Switchbacks	2020	USL Championship	14	1	—		—		—		14	1
Celtix du Haut-Richelieu	2021	Première Ligue de soccer du Québec	10	11	—		—		—		10	11
HFX Wanderers FC	2021	Canadian Premier League	10	0	—		0	0	—		10	0
FC Edmonton	2022	Canadian Premier League	26	4	—		1	0	—		27	4
Career total			91	24	0	0	1	0	2	0	94	24
