= Mastanabal Kacher =

Algerian professional footballer (born 1995)

Masta Kacher
Personal information
- Full name: Mastanabal Kacher
- Date of birth: 8 November 1995 (age 31)
- Place of birth: Azazga, Algeria
- Height: 1.79 m (5 ft 10 in)
- Position: Midfielder

Youth career
- 2012–2015: Montreal Impact

Senior career*
Years	Team	Apps	(Gls)
2015–2016	FC Montreal	36	(4)
2017–2018	Colorado Springs Switchbacks	32	(8)
2018–2019	Real Monarchs	37	(4)
2019	Saint Louis FC	13	(1)
2020–2021	Valour FC	17	(1)
2022	FC Edmonton	23	(1)
2025–	CS Rivière-des-Prairies	4	(2)
- * Club domestic league appearances and goals as of October 8, 2025

Mastanabal "Masta" Kacher (born 8 November 1995) is an Algerian professional footballer who plays for CS Rivière-des-Prairies in Ligue2 Québec.

== Early life ==
Kacher was born in Azazga, Algeria, before emigrating to Canada with his family at age six.

== Club career ==
=== FC Montreal ===
Kacher had been a member of the Montreal Impact's academy since its inception in 2011. In March 2015, it was announced that Kacher would play for FC Montreal, the USL reserve club of the Montreal Impact in their inaugural season. He made his professional debut for the club in a 2–0 defeat to Toronto FC II. Kacher would spend two seasons with FC Montreal before the club ceased operations after the 2016 season, a decision which he would be critical of.

=== Colorado Springs Switchbacks ===
On 17 January 2017, it was announced that Kacher had joined Colorado Springs Switchbacks FC of the United Soccer League. Kacher would start every match for the Switchbacks in the 2017 season, scoring 8 goals. It was announced on January 16 that the Switchbacks had brought Kacher back for the 2018 season, but less than a month later on 12 February Kacher was unexpectedly released from the club. Kacher was the only USL player to have started all 32 games during the 2017 season.

=== Real Monarchs ===
The same day Kacher was released, he signed with Real Monarchs, the United Soccer League reserve club of Real Salt Lake. In his second game with Real Monarchs, Kacher scored a brace in a 3–1 defeat of Seattle Sounders FC 2. He made 24 league appearances in 2018, scoring three goals. The following season, he made fourteen appearances, scoring one goal.

=== Saint Louis FC ===
On 16 July 2019, Kacher made a mid-season move to Saint Louis FC. With Saint Louis, he made fifteen appearances that season.

=== Valour FC ===
On 3 April 2020, Kacher signed with Canadian Premier League side Valour FC. He made his debut for Valour on 16 August against Cavalry FC. In January 2022 he departed club.

=== FC Edmonton ===
On 17 February 2022, Kacher signed with FC Edmonton.
