= C. J. Smith (soccer) =

Canadian soccer player (born 1998)

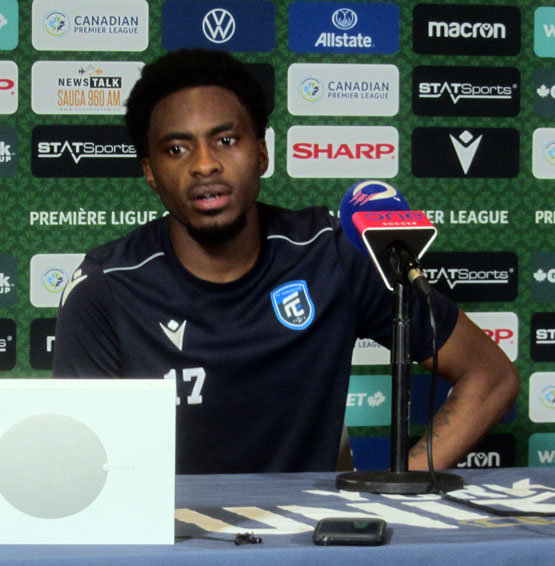
- Smith in 2022

Personal information
- Full name: Courtney-Junior Mitchell-Smith
- Date of birth: January 21, 1998 (age 28)
- Place of birth: Brampton, Ontario, Canada
- Height: 1.83 m (6 ft 0 in)
- Position: Forward

Youth career
- Grand Valley Minor Soccer
- Brampton East SC
- ProStars FC
- 2016: ETO FC Győr

College career
Years	Team	Apps	(Gls)
2017–2018	Mississippi Gulf Coast Bulldogs	31	(16)
2019	South Carolina Gamecocks	15	(3)
2020	Georgia Southern Eagles	6	(0)
2021	Houston Baptist Huskies	17	(5)

Senior career*
Years	Team	Apps	(Gls)
2016	ProStars FC	11	(2)
2017	Master's FA	2	(0)
2018–2019	Colorado Pride Switchbacks U23	20	(5)
2021	Port City FC	8	(5)
2022	HFX Wanderers FC	0	(0)
2022	→ FC Edmonton (loan)	21	(2)
2023	Vaughan Azzurri	3	(0)
2023–2024	Simcoe County Rovers	25	(4)
2026	Canadian Crusaders (indoor)	1	(0)
- * Club domestic league appearances and goals as of April 11, 2026

Courtney-Junior Mitchell-Smith (born January 12, 1998) is a Canadian professional soccer player.

== Early career ==
Smith began playing soccer with Grand Valley Minor Soccer, before moving to Brampton East SC. Afterwards, Smith joined the ProStars FC Academy. In February 2016, he joined the U19 side of Hungarian club ETO FC Győr.

== College career ==
In 2017, he began attending Mississippi Gulf Coast Community College. He scored his first goal on September 1, 2017, against the Jones Bobcats, scoring twice and adding an assist. On October 5, 2018, he scored a hat trick against the Meridian Eagles. For the 2018 season, Smith was selected to play in the Mississippi Association of Community & Junior Colleges Men's All-Star Soccer Game (however the match was cancelled due to poor field conditions) and was named to the United Soccer Coaches Men's NJCAA Division I All-South Region team.

In 2019, he transferred to the University of South Carolina to play for the men's soccer team. He scored his first goals on October 1, scoring twice against the Presbyterian Blue Hose.

In 2020, he transferred to Georgia Southern University to play for the Georgia Southern Eagles. He made six appearances, including two starts, recording one assist.

In 2021, he began attending Houston Baptist University, where he played for the Houston Baptist Huskies. In his debut on August 26, he scored a golden goal winner in extra time over the St. Thomas Tommies. He appeared in all 17 matches, scoring five goals, which all came within the team's first five games, including a two-goal performance against the Huston–Tillotson Rams.

== Club career ==
In 2016, he returned to ProStars FC and played in League1 Ontario. After facing Toronto FC III during a league match, he was invited to train with the Toronto FC Academy.

In 2017, he played for Master's FA in League1 Ontario.

In 2018 and 2019, he played with the Colorado Pride Switchbacks U23 in USL League Two. He scored his first goals on May 26, 2018, netting a brace against Albuquerque Sol FC, which earned him PDL Western Conference Team of the Week honours.

In 2021, he played for Port City FC in the National Premier Soccer League. He scored his first goal on May 27 against Jacksonville Armada U-23. He scored a brace on June 5 against Florida Roots FC.

In March 2022, Smith signed a professional contract with Canadian Premier League club HFX Wanderers FC, immediately being sent on an intra-league loan to FC Edmonton. He scored his first goal on September 10 against York United FC.

In 2023, he began the season playing with Vaughan Azzurri in League1 Ontario, before switching to the Simcoe County Rovers.
