= Simon Triantafillou =

Canadian soccer player (born 1999)

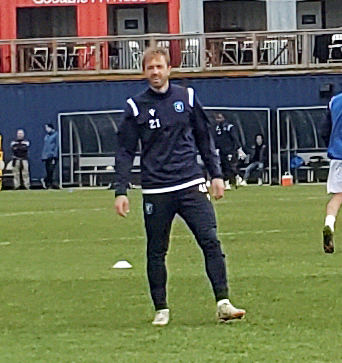
- Triantafillou in 2022 with FC Edmonton

Personal information
- Date of birth: August 25, 1999 (age 27)
- Place of birth: Burlington, Ontario, Canada
- Height: 1.83 m (6 ft 0 in)
- Position: Midfielder

Youth career
- Sigma FC

College career
Years	Team	Apps	(Gls)
2017–2020	Syracuse Orange	66	(4)
2021	Providence Friars	21	(1)

Senior career*
Years	Team	Apps	(Gls)
2015–2019	Sigma FC	38+	(3)
2022	Forge FC	0	(0)
2022	Pacific FC	0	(0)
2022	→ FC Edmonton (loan)	26	(0)
2023–2024	Burlington SC	22	(0)
- * Club domestic league appearances and goals as of August 14, 2024

Simon Triantafillou (born August 25, 1999) is a former Canadian soccer player who played as a midfielder. He is the current Team Analyst for USL League One club New York Cosmos.

== Early life ==
Triantafillou joined the youth system of Sigma FC at age 11. He later had a two-week trial with Belgian club Genk.

== College career ==
In 2017, he committed to attend Syracuse University, where he would play for the men's soccer team. He recorded his first assist on October 25, 2017, against the Boston College Eagles. He scored his first goal on September 6, 2019, against the Yale Bulldogs. In 2020, for his senior season, he was named team captain, and he was named to the All-ACC Academic Team. He was also awarded the Dean Foty Award, which is awarded to the Syracuse player with the most positive influence on the team's attitude.

After graduating from Syracuse, he moved to Providence College for a graduate degree and played for the men's soccer for his final season of eligibility. He scored his only goal on October 13 in a 3–0 win against the number 1 ranked Georgetown Hoyas. He appeared in 21 matches for Providence, leading the team that season with six assists.

== Club career ==
He played in League1 Ontario with Sigma FC. With Sigma, he served as team captain for a period. He scored his first goal on May 18, 2018, against Master's FA.

In February 2022, he signed a contract with Canadian Premier League club Forge FC, ahead of their CONCACAF Champions League matches against Cruz Azul, but did not appear in either match.

In April 2022, he signed a contract with Pacific FC of the Canadian Premier League, immediately being loaned to fellow CPL club FC Edmonton.

In 2023, he played with Burlington SC in League1 Ontario. In 2024, he was named a league Second Team All-Star.

== International career ==
In 2014, he attended a national team camp for the Canada U15 team.
