= 2020 Toronto FC season =

Toronto FC 2020 soccer season

Toronto FC
2020 season
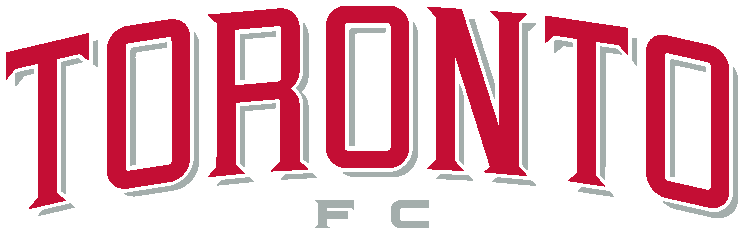
- Owner: Maple Leaf Sports & Entertainment
- President: Bill Manning
- Head coach: Greg Vanney
- Stadium: BMO Field; Pratt & Whitney Stadium (East Hartford, Connecticut) (Note: Starting from September 27, all of Toronto FC's home matches were played in East Hartford, Connecticut due to travel restrictions between Canada and the United States.)
- Major League Soccer: Conference: 2nd Overall: 2nd
- MLS Cup playoffs: First round
- Canadian Championship: Winners (Note: The final was held in 2022 after being postponed due to the COVID-19 pandemic)
- Leagues Cup: Cancelled
- MLS is Back Tournament: Round of 16
- Top goalscorer: League: Ayo Akinola; Alejandro Pozuelo (9 each); All: Ayo Akinola; Alejandro Pozuelo (9 each)
- Biggest win: 3–0 (August 18 vs. Vancouver Whitecaps FC)
- Biggest defeat: 0–5 (October 24 at Philadelphia Union)
Home colours	Away colours

The 2020 Toronto FC season was the 14th season in the history of Toronto FC. The club entered the season as defending MLS Eastern Conference champions. They were scheduled to compete for the first time in the Leagues Cup; however, the tournament was cancelled due to the COVID-19 pandemic. They participated in the MLS is Back Tournament, which was the beginning of the resumed season following the postponement of regular season matches due to the pandemic.

On September 11, 2020, Connecticut governor Ned Lamont announced that Toronto FC would finish their season's home matches at Pratt & Whitney Stadium due to travel restrictions outside the United States due to the pandemic.

On October 11, Toronto FC became the first MLS team to clinch a playoff berth following a 1–0 win over FC Cincinnati.

== Squad ==
As of October 14, 2020.

No.	Player	Nationality	Position(s)	Date of birth (age)	Signed in	Previous club
Goalkeepers
16	Quentin Westberg	(United States) (France)	GK	April 25, 1986 (aged 34)	2019	(France) Auxerre
25	Alex Bono	(United States)	GK	April 25, 1994 (aged 26)	2015	(United States) Syracuse Orange
90	Kevin Silva	(United States)	GK	January 5, 1998 (aged 22)	2020	(United States) Toronto FC II
Defenders
2	Justin Morrow	(United States)	LB / LWB / CB	October 4, 1987 (aged 33)	2014	(United States) San Jose Earthquakes
3	Eriq Zavaleta	(United States)	CB	August 2, 1992 (aged 28)	2015	(United States) Seattle Sounders FC
5	Julian Dunn	(Canada)	CB	July 11, 2000 (aged 20)	2018	(Canada) Toronto FC II
6	Tony Gallacher (loan)	(Scotland)	LB	July 23, 1999 (aged 21)	2020	(England) Liverpool
12	Rocco Romeo (out on loan)	(Canada)	CB	March 25, 2000 (aged 20)	2020	(Canada) Toronto FC II
22	Richie Laryea	(Canada)	RB	January 7, 1995 (aged 25)	2019	(United States) Orlando City SC
23	Chris Mavinga	(Democratic Republic of the Congo) (France)	CB / LB	May 26, 1991 (aged 29)	2017	(Russia) Rubin Kazan
26	Laurent Ciman	(Belgium) (Note: Ciman had Canadian Permanent Residency status, so he counted as a domestic player for MLS purposes.)	CB	August 5, 1985 (aged 35)	2018	(France) Dijon
44	Omar Gonzalez	(United States)	CB	October 11, 1988 (aged 32)	2019	(Mexico) Pachuca
96	Auro Jr.	(Brazil)	RB / RWB	January 23, 1996 (aged 24)	2018	(Brazil) São Paulo
Midfielders
4	Michael Bradley	(United States)	CM	July 31, 1987 (aged 33)	2014	(Italy) Roma
8	Marky Delgado	(United States)	CM	May 16, 1995 (aged 25)	2015	(United States) Chivas USA
10	Alejandro Pozuelo	(Spain)	AM	September 20, 1991 (aged 29)	2019	(Belgium) Genk
14	Noble Okello (out on loan)	(Canada)	MF	July 20, 2000 (aged 20)	2019	(Canada) Toronto FC II
18	Nick DeLeon	(United States)	RB / RM	July 17, 1990 (aged 30)	2018	(United States) D.C. United
21	Jonathan Osorio	(Canada)	AM / CM	June 12, 1992 (aged 28)	2013	(Canada) SC Toronto
27	Liam Fraser	(Canada)	DM	February 13, 1998 (aged 22)	2018	(Canada) Toronto FC II
31	Tsubasa Endoh	(Japan)	MF	August 20, 1993 (aged 27)	2019	(Canada) Toronto FC II
97	Ralph Priso	(Canada)	MF	August 2, 2002 (aged 18)	2020	(Canada) Toronto FC II
Forwards
7	Pablo Piatti	(Argentina)	LW/RW	March 31, 1989 (aged 31)	2020	(Spain) Espanyol
9	Erickson Gallardo	(Venezuela)	RW	July 26, 1996 (aged 24)	2019	(Venezuela) Zamora
13	Patrick Mullins	(United States)	FW	February 5, 1992 (aged 28)	2019	(United States) Columbus Crew
15	Jahkeele Marshall-Rutty	(Canada)	FW	June 16, 2004 (aged 16)	2020	(Canada) Toronto FC II
17	Jozy Altidore	(United States)	CF	November 6, 1989 (aged 31)	2015	(England) Sunderland
19	Griffin Dorsey	(United States)	FW	March 5, 1999 (aged 21)	2019	(United States) Indiana Hoosiers
20	Ayo Akinola	(United States) (Canada)	ST	January 20, 2000 (aged 20)	2018	(Canada) Toronto FC II
24	Jacob Shaffelburg	(Canada)	FW	November 26, 1999 (aged 21)	2019	(Canada) Toronto FC II
80	Jayden Nelson	(Canada)	FW	September 26, 2002 (aged 18)	2020	(Canada) Toronto FC II
99	Ifunanyachi Achara	(Nigeria)	FW	September 28, 1997 (aged 23)	2020	(United States) Georgetown Hoyas

=== Roster slots ===
Toronto had eight International roster slots and three Designated Player slots available for use in the 2020 season.

International slots
Slot	Player	Nationality
1	Ifunanyachi Achara	Nigeria
2	Auro Jr.	Brazil
3	Tsubasa Endoh	Japan
4	Tony Gallacher	Scotland
5	Erickson Gallardo	Venezuela
6	Chris Mavinga	DR Congo
7	Pablo Piatti	Argentina
8	Alejandro Pozuelo	Spain

Designated Player slots
Slot	Player
1	(United States) Jozy Altidore
2	(Spain) Alejandro Pozuelo
3	(Argentina) Pablo Piatti

== Transfers ==
Note: All figures in United States dollars.

=== In ===
No.	Pos.	Player	From	Fee/notes	Date	Source
12	CB	(Canada) Rocco Romeo	(Canada) Toronto FC II	Homegrown signing	January 21, 2020	
15	FW	(Canada) Jahkeele Marshall-Rutty	(Canada) Toronto FC II	Homegrown signing	January 22, 2020	
80	FW	(Canada) Jayden Nelson	(Canada) Toronto FC II	Homegrown signing	January 23, 2020	
7	FW	(Argentina) Pablo Piatti	(Spain) Espanyol	Designated player	February 7, 2020	
99	FW	(Nigeria) Ifunanyachi Achara	(United States) Georgetown Hoyas	Signed draft pick	February 21, 2020	
90	GK	(United States) Kevin Silva	(Canada) Toronto FC II	Signed first team deal	July 3, 2020	
97	MF	(Canada) Ralph Priso	(Canada) Toronto FC II	Homegrown signing	October 14, 2020	

==== Loaned in ====
No.	Pos.	Player	Loaned from	Fee/notes	Date	Source
6	DF	(Scotland) Tony Gallacher	(England) Liverpool	Season long loan	August 10, 2020	

==== Draft picks ====
The following players were selected by Toronto FC in the 2020 SuperDraft held on January 9.

First round

Pos.	Player	College	Overall
DF	(Canada) Nyal Higgins	Syracuse	19
MF	(Nigeria) Ifunanyachi Achara	Georgetown	25

Second round

Pos.	Player	College	Overall
DF	(Senegal) Malick Mbaye	Clemson	33
DF	(Denmark) Simon Waever	Indiana	51

=== Out ===
==== Transferred out ====
No.	Pos.	Player	To	Fee/notes	Date	Source
14	MF	(Canada) Jay Chapman	(United States) Inter Miami CF	Traded for $100,000 in GAM	November 13, 2019	
3	CB	(United States) Drew Moor	(United States) Colorado Rapids	Out of contract	November 21, 2019	
28	GK	(United States) Caleb Patterson-Sewell	MLS Pool Goalkeeper	Option declined	November 21, 2019	
5	DF	(Canada) Ashtone Morgan	(United States) Real Salt Lake	Option declined	November 21, 2019	
55	MF	(Canada) Aidan Daniels	(United States) Colorado Springs Switchbacks	Option declined	November 21, 2019	
54	FW	(Trinidad and Tobago) Ryan Telfer	(Cyprus) Nea Salamis	Option declined	November 21, 2019	
11	FW	(Spain) Jon Bakero	(United States) Phoenix Rising	Option declined	November 21, 2019	
7	MF	(France) Nicolas Benezet	(United States) Colorado Rapids	Traded for $50,000 in GAM	January 12, 2020	

==== Loaned out ====
No.	Pos.	Player	Loaned to	Fee/notes	Date	Source
5	DF	(Canada) Julian Dunn	(Canada) Valour FC	Season long loan	August 10, 2020	
12	DF	(Canada) Rocco Romeo	(Denmark) HB Køge	Year long loan until June 2021	August 14, 2020	
14	MF	(Canada) Noble Okello	(Denmark) HB Køge	Season long loan until December 2020	September 25, 2020	

== Pre-season ==
Toronto FC's pre-season officially began on January 18 when players and staff attended BMO Training Ground to undergo medical evaluations. Their first official training session of the season occurred on January 20 in Orlando, Florida as part of the team's preliminary training camp. The team resumed training camp on February 5 at the University of California, Irvine and played a series of friendly matches.

=== Matches ===
February 8 Friendly	Toronto FC	4–0	Colorado Rapids	Irvine, California
11:00 AM PT	Gallardo 20'; Altidore 46'; Osorio 49'; Shaffelburg 67'	Report		Stadium: University of California, Irvine
Note: Match featured two 60-minute halves.

February 10 Friendly	UC Irvine	0–2	Toronto FC	Irvine, California
10:00 AM PT		Report	Achara o.g.	Stadium: University of California, Irvine

February 12 Friendly	Los Angeles FC	3–1	Toronto FC	Los Angeles, California
12:00 PM PT	Rodríguez 20'; Blessing 74'; Torres 81'	Report	Achara 51'	Stadium: Banc of California Stadium

February 15 Friendly	LA Galaxy	1–2	Toronto FC	Carson, California
3:00 PM PT	Katai (red card) 32'; Pavón 37'	Report; Report	Achara 45+2'; Pozuelo 77' (pen.)	Stadium: Dignity Health Sports Park

February 19 Friendly	Toronto FC	0–2	Chicago Fire FC	Irvine, California
3:00 PM PT		Report	Slonina 15'; Collier 31'	Stadium: University of California, Irvine

February 22 Friendly	Toronto FC	1–1	Colorado Rapids	Carson, California
12:00 PM PT	Endoh 1'	Report	Shinyashiki 3'	Stadium: Dignity Health Sports Park

== Competitions ==
=== Major League Soccer ===
==== League tables ====
Eastern Conference

Pos	Team	Pld	Pts	PPG
1	Philadelphia Union	23	47	2.04
2	Toronto FC	23	44	1.91
3	Columbus Crew SC (C)	23	41	1.78
4	Orlando City SC	23	41	1.78
5	New York City FC	23	39	1.70

Source: MLS
(C) Champions

Overall

2020 MLS overall standings
Pos	Team	Pld	Pts	PPG
1	Philadelphia Union (S)	23	47	2.04
2	Toronto FC (V)	23	44	1.91
3	Sporting Kansas City	21	39	1.86
4	Columbus Crew SC (C)	23	41	1.78
5	Orlando City SC	23	41	1.78

Source: MLS
(C) Champions; (S) Supporters' Shield winners; (V) Canadian Championship finalists

==== Summary ====
Overall								Home						Away					
Pld	W	D	L	GF	GA	GD	Pts	W	D	L	GF	GA	GD	W	D	L	GF	GA	GD
20	12	3	5	27	21	+6	39	7	1	2	14	6	+8	5	2	3	13	15	−2

Note: Table does not include three group matches of MLS is Back Tournament.
(Pld 3, W 1, D 2, L 0, GF 6, GA 5, GD +1, Pts 5)

==== Results by round ====
Round	1	2	3	4	5	6	7	8	9	10	11	12	13	14	15	16	17	18	19	20	21	22	23
Ground	A	H	N	N	N	H	H	A	H	A	A	A	A	H	H	A	A	H	H	A	H	H	A
Result	D	W	D	W	D	W	W	W	L	L	W	D	W	W	W	W	W	D	W	L	L	W	L
Position (Note: Eastern Conference position at the completion of each matchday.)	5	4	4	2	2	2	2	1	2	3	3	4	4	3	2	1	1	1	1	2	2	2	2

A = Away; H = Home; N = Neutral; W = Win; D = Draw; L = Loss; P = Postponed

==== Matches ====
The 2020 Major League Soccer schedule was originally released in full on December 19, 2019, 12:00 PM ET. However, the season was suspended on March 12 due to the COVID-19 pandemic, resulting in the cancellation of matches. The season resumed in July with the MLS is Back Tournament, where the three group stage matches counted as regular season games. Following the tournament, the regular season continued; however, due to travel restrictions between the United States and Canada, the league's three Canadian teams played their next six matches against each other in Canada, with these matches also serving as the qualification process for the 2020 Canadian Championship.

February 29 1	San Jose Earthquakes	2–2	Toronto FC	San Jose, California
5:30 PM ET	Thompson (yellow card) 33'; Ríos 53'; Yueill (yellow card) 70'; Kashia (yellow card) 81'; Alanís 90+5'; Wondolowski (yellow card) 90+6'	Report	Pozuelo 40' (pen.); Laryea 51'; Altidore (yellow card) 71'; Endoh (yellow card) 90+4'	Stadium: Avaya Stadium; Attendance: 18,000; Referee: Armando Villarreal

March 7 2	Toronto FC	1–0	New York City FC	Toronto, Ontario
5:00 PM ET	Achara 81'; Auro (yellow card) 87'	Report	Ring (yellow card) 22'; Sands (yellow card) 35'; Parks (yellow card) 69'	Stadium: BMO Field; Attendance: 26,171; Referee: Ted Unkel

July 13 3 (MiBT)	Toronto FC	2–2	D.C. United	Bay Lake, Florida
9:00 AM EST	Akinola 12', 44'	Report	Moreno (yellow card) 18' (yellow-red card) 45+6'; Felipe (yellow card) 71'; Canouse (yellow card) 82'; Higuaín 84'; Brillant 90+1'	Stadium: ESPN Wide World of Sports Complex; Attendance: 0 (Note: All matches in the MLS Is Back Tournament were played behind closed doors due to the COVID-19 pandemic in Florida.); Referee: Fotis Bazakos
Note: The match originally scheduled for July 10, 2020, 8:00 PM EDT, was rescheduled to July 12 due to Toronto FC's delayed arrival in Florida. As a result, the match between San Jose Earthquakes and Seattle Sounders FC, originally scheduled for July 10, 2020, 10:30 PM EDT, was moved to 9:00 PM EDT. The match on July 12 was postponed minutes prior to kickoff due to at least one player testing positive for COVID-19. Later that day the match was rescheduled for the following day, July 13.

July 16 4 (MiBT)	Montreal Impact	3–4	Toronto FC	Bay Lake, Florida
8:00 PM EST	Maciel (yellow card) 6'; Quioto 14'; Taïder 37' (pen.), 90+5' (pen.)	Report	Laryea 8'; Akinola 25', 37', 83'	Stadium: ESPN Wide World of Sports Complex; Attendance: 0 Referee: Jair Marrufo
Note: The match originally scheduled for July 15, 2020, 8:00 PM EDT, was rescheduled to July 16 due to the rescheduling of Toronto's previous match.

July 21 5 (MiBT)	Toronto FC	0–0	New England Revolution	Bay Lake, Florida
9:00 AM EDT	Bradley (yellow card) 50'	Report	Rowe (yellow card) 38'; Caldwell (yellow card) 41'	Stadium: ESPN Wide World of Sports Complex; Attendance: 0 Referee: Jair Marrufo

August 18 6 (CC)	Toronto FC	3–0	Vancouver Whitecaps FC	Toronto, Ontario
8:00 PM ET	Piatti 27', 55'; Auro (yellow card) 80'; DeLeon 83'	Report	Cavallini (yellow card) 18'; Teibert (yellow card) 76'	Stadium: BMO Field; Attendance: 0 Referee: David Gantar

August 21 7 (CC)	Toronto FC	1–0	Vancouver Whitecaps FC	Toronto, Ontario
8:00 PM ET	Laryea 15'; Fraser (yellow card) 36'; Piatti (yellow card) 84'; Pozuelo (yellow card) 86'	Report	Rose (yellow card) 55'	Stadium: BMO Field; Attendance: 0 Referee: Silviu Petrescu

August 28 8 (CC)	Montreal Impact	0–1	Toronto FC	Montreal, Quebec
8:00PM ET	Wanyama (yellow card) 57'; Camacho (yellow card) 68'	Report	Pozuelo 50' (pen.), (yellow card) 90+3'	Stadium: Saputo Stadium; Attendance: 250; Referee: David Gantar

September 1 9 (CC)	Toronto FC	0–1	Montreal Impact	Toronto, Ontario
8:00 PM ET	Pozuelo (penalty missed) 45+1', (yellow card) 59'	Report	Camacho 14', (yellow card) 45'; Brault-Guillard (yellow card) 46'; Wanyama (yellow card) 52'; Taïder (yellow card) 88'; Maciel (yellow card) 90+7'	Stadium: BMO Field; Attendance: 0 Referee: Drew Fischer

September 5 10 (CC)	Vancouver Whitecaps FC	3–2	Toronto FC	Vancouver, British Columbia
9:30 PM ET	Cavallini 17', (yellow card) 78'; Adnan (yellow card) 44'; Baldisimo 57', (yellow card) 82'; Nerwinski 76'; Raposo (yellow card) 90+7'	Report	Osorio 25'; Pozuelo 71'; Ciman (yellow card) 76'; Auro (yellow card) 86'	Stadium: BC Place; Attendance: 0 Referee: Silviu Petrescu

September 9 11 (CC)	Montreal Impact	1–2	Toronto FC	Montreal, Quebec
8:00 PM ET	Wanyama 53'	Report	Piatti 32'; Altidore 89'	Stadium: Saputo Stadium; Attendance: 250; Referee: David Gantar

September 19 12	D.C. United	2–2	Toronto FC	Washington, D.C.
7:30 PM ET	Kamara 5'; Paredes (yellow card) 81'; Yow 88'	Report	Pozuelo 17'; DeLeon (yellow card) 25'; Piatti (yellow card) 41'; Akinola 60'; Laryea (yellow card) 67'	Stadium: Audi Field; Attendance: 0 Referee: Armando Villarreal

September 23 13	New York City FC	0–1	Toronto FC	Harrison, New Jersey
7:00 PM ET	Callens (yellow card) 22'; Castellanos (yellow card) 36'; Sands (yellow card) 72'; Acevedo (yellow card) 89'	Report	Piatti (yellow card) 25'; DeLeon (yellow card) 40'; Altidore (yellow card) 56'; Nelson (yellow card) 64'; Pozuelo 90' (pen.)	Stadium: Red Bull Arena (Note: New York City FC used Red Bull Arena as their home venue due to Yankee Stadium being unavailable because of COVID-19 precautions during the 2020 Major League Baseball season.); Referee: Joe Dickerson

September 27 14	Toronto FC	3–1	Columbus Crew	East Hartford, Connecticut
7:30 PM ET	Altidore (yellow card) 28', (goal) 48'; Pozuelo 59'; Laryea 76'; Delgado (yellow card) 86'	Report	Mavinga 40' (o.g.); Zelarayán (yellow card) 60'; Morris (yellow card) 67'	Stadium: Pratt & Whitney Stadium; Attendance: 0 Referee: Tim Ford

October 3 15	Toronto FC	2–1	Philadelphia Union	East Hartford, Connecticut
7:30 PM ET	Akinola 58'; Pozuelo 76'	Report	Santos 5'; Martínez (yellow card) 83'	Stadium: Pratt & Whitney Stadium; Attendance: 0 Referee: Victor Rivas

October 7 16	New England Revolution	0–1	Toronto FC	Foxborough, Massachusetts
7:30 PM ET	McNamara (yellow card) 40'; Kessler (yellow card) 48'; Bye (yellow card) 63'; Buksa (penalty missed) 68'; Bunbury (yellow card) 90+3'	Report	Akinola 29'; Auro (yellow card) 71'; Laryea (yellow card) 84'	Stadium: Gillette Stadium; Referee: Nima Saghafi

October 11 17	FC Cincinnati	0–1	Toronto FC	Cincinnati, Ohio
7:30 PM ET	Gutman (yellow card) 66'; Hagglund (yellow card) 67'	Report	Gonzalez (yellow card) 9'; Osorio (yellow card) 21'; Mullins 29'; Ciman (yellow card) 72'	Stadium: Nippert Stadium; Referee: Robert Sibiga

October 14 18	Toronto FC	1–1	New York Red Bulls	East Hartford, Connecticut
7:30 PM ET	Pozuelo 23' (pen.); Piatti (yellow card) 53'; Akinola (yellow card) 60'	Report	Yearwood (yellow card) 22'; Rzatkowski (yellow card) 52'; Tarek (yellow card) 71'; Clark 77'	Stadium: Pratt & Whitney Stadium; Attendance: 0 Referee: Guido Gonzales Jr.

October 18 19	Toronto FC	1–0	Atlanta United FC	East Hartford, Connecticut
7:30 PM ET	Gonzalez (yellow card) 42'; Piatti 89'	Report	Robinson (yellow card) 81'	Stadium: Pratt & Whitney Stadium; Attendance: 0 Referee: Fotis Bazakos

October 24 20	Philadelphia Union	5–0	Toronto FC	Chester, Pennsylvania
7:30 PM ET	Monteiro (yellow card) 9', (goal) 56'; Santos 27', 63', 68'; McKenzie 33'; Blake (yellow card) 64'	Report	Auro (yellow card) 10'; Mullins (yellow card) 73'	Stadium: Subaru Park; Referee: Jair Marrufo

October 28 21	Toronto FC	0–1	New York City FC	East Hartford, Connecticut
7:30 PM ET	Morrow (yellow card) 3'	Report	Callens (yellow card) 45+1'; Medina 51', (yellow card) 90+2'; Castellanos (yellow card) 75'	Stadium: Pratt & Whitney Stadium; Attendance: 0 Referee: Nima Saghafi

November 1 22	Toronto FC	2–1	Inter Miami CF	East Hartford, Connecticut
7:30 PM ET	Akinola 55'; Bradley (yellow card) 77'; Pozuelo 84' (pen.)	Report	Matuidi 42', (yellow card) 69'; Sweat (yellow card) 82'	Stadium: Pratt & Whitney Stadium; Attendance: 1,394; Referee: Rosendo Mendoza

November 8 23	New York Red Bulls	2–1	Toronto FC	Harrison, New Jersey
3:30 PM ET	Yearwood (yellow card) 15'; Barlow 24'; White 26'; Stroud (yellow card) 32'; Meara (yellow card) 85'	Report	Mavinga (yellow card) 22'; Endoh 50'; Nelson (yellow card) 90+4'	Stadium: Red Bull Arena; Referee: Ted Unkel

=== MLS Cup Playoffs ===
November 24 First round	Toronto FC	0–1 (a.e.t.)	Nashville SC	East Hartford, Connecticut
6:00 PM ET		Report	Ríos 108'	Stadium: Pratt & Whitney Stadium; Attendance: 0 Referee: Robert Sibiga

=== Canadian Championship ===
==== Qualification ====
As part of the MLS regular season, Canada's three Major League Soccer clubs played each other three times from August 18 to September 16. The team with the most points from this series, Toronto FC, qualified for the Canadian Championship.

Pos	Team	Pld	W	D	L	GF	GA	GD	Pts	Qualification
1	Toronto FC	6	4	0	2	9	5	+4	12	Qualification for the 2020 Canadian Championship and the 2021 CONCACAF Champions League
2	Montreal Impact	6	3	0	3	9	8	+1	9	
3	Vancouver Whitecaps FC	6	2	0	4	8	13	−5	6	

Source: MLS
Rules for classification: 1) points; 2) total wins; 3) goal differential; 4) goals for; 5) away goal differential; 6) away goals for; 7) home goal differential; 8) home goals for 9) coin toss or drawing of lots.

==== Final ====
After being unable to be held in 2020, the match was initially postponed to early 2021 to occur at the beginning of the 2021 season. On March 11, 2021, it was announced that the match could not be completed in time for the start of CCL competition; a compromise was reached where Toronto FC would be named to the CCL slot, while Forge FC would be permitted to host the match once it was finally played. On March 25, 2021, Canada Soccer president Nick Bontis said that the final may end up taking place as late as July 2022. On March 2, 2022, it was announced that the final would take place on June 4, 2022 at Tim Hortons Field.

June 4, 2022 Final	Forge FC	1–1 (4–5 p)	Toronto FC	Hamilton, Ontario
7:00 PM ET	Achinioti-Jönsson (yellow card) 25'; Owolabi-Belewu (yellow card) 55'; Borges 60', (yellow card) 67'; Morgan (yellow card) 77'; Hojabrpour (yellow card) 81'	Report	Petrasso (yellow card) 19'; MacNaughton (yellow card) 24'; Pozuelo 57', (yellow card) 62'; Akinola (yellow card) 69'	Stadium: Tim Hortons Field; Attendance: 13,715; Referee: Silviu Petrescu
	Penalties
	Achinioti-Jönsson (penalty scored); Campbell (penalty scored); Pacius (penalty scored); Bekker (penalty missed); Choinière (penalty scored); Poku (penalty missed)		(penalty scored) Jiménez; (penalty scored) Salcedo; (penalty missed) Kerr; (penalty scored) Pozuelo; (penalty scored) Perruzza; (penalty scored) Thompson

=== Leagues Cup ===
Toronto FC was set to compete for the first time in the Leagues Cup after not qualifying the CONCACAF Champions League and finishing in fourth place in the Eastern Conference during the 2019 regular season. They were to host a club from Liga MX in Mexico and entered the draw as the fifth seeded MLS team. The tournament was cancelled on May 19, 2020, due to the COVID-19 pandemic.

July 21/22 Round of 16	Toronto FC	Cancelled	(Mexico) TBD	Toronto, Ontario
				Stadium: BMO Field

=== Group stage ===
==== Group C ====
Group C results
Pos	Team	Pld	W	D	L	GF	GA	GD	Pts	Qualification
1	Toronto FC	3	1	2	0	6	5	+1	5	Advance to knockout stage
2	New England Revolution	3	1	2	0	2	1	+1	5	Advance to knockout stage
3	Montreal Impact	3	1	0	2	4	5	−1	3	Advance to knockout stage
4	D.C. United	3	0	2	1	3	4	−1	2	

Source: MLS

July 13 3	Toronto FC	2–2	D.C. United	Bay Lake, Florida
9:00 AM EST	Akinola 12', 44'	Report	Moreno (yellow card) 18' (yellow-red card) 45+6'; Felipe (yellow card) 71'; Canouse (yellow card) 82'; Higuaín 84'; Brillant 90+1'	Stadium: ESPN Wide World of Sports Complex; Attendance: 0 Referee: Fotis Bazakos
Note: The match, originally scheduled for July 10, 2020, 8:00 PM EDT, was rescheduled to July 12 due to Toronto FC's delayed arrival in Florida. As a result, the match between San Jose Earthquakes and Seattle Sounders FC, originally scheduled for July 10, 2020, 10:30 PM EDT, was moved to 9:00 PM EDT. The match on July 12 was postponed minutes prior to kickoff due to at least one player testing positive for COVID-19. Later that day the match was rescheduled for the following day, July 13.

July 16 4	Montreal Impact	3–4	Toronto FC	Bay Lake, Florida
8:00 PM EST	Maciel (yellow card) 6'; Quioto 14'; Taïder 37' (pen.), 90+5' (pen.)	Report	Laryea 8'; Akinola 25', 37', 83'	Stadium: ESPN Wide World of Sports Complex; Attendance: 0 Referee: Jair Marrufo
Note: The match, originally scheduled for July 15, 2020, 8:00 PM EDT, was rescheduled to July 16 due to the rescheduling of Toronto's previous match.

July 21 5	Toronto FC	0–0	New England Revolution	Bay Lake, Florida
9:00 AM EDT	Bradley (yellow card) 50'	Report	Rowe (yellow card) 38'; Caldwell (yellow card) 41'	Stadium: ESPN Wide World of Sports Complex; Attendance: 0 Referee: Jair Marrufo

=== Knockout stage ===
==== Round of 16 ====
July 26 Round of 16	Toronto FC	1–3	New York City FC	Bay Lake, Florida
8:30 PM EDT	Gonzalez (yellow card) 15'; Osorio (yellow card) 83'; Mullins 87'	Report	Medina 5'; Ring (yellow card) 12'; Castellanos 55'; Sands (yellow card) 66'; Moralez 81'	Stadium: ESPN Wide World of Sports Complex; Attendance: 0 Referee: Alex Chilowicz

=== Competitions summary ===
Competition	Record								First Match	Last Match	Final Position
Competition	Pld	W	D	L	GF	GA	GD	Win %	First Match	Last Match	Final Position
MLS Regular Season	23	14	5	4	44	20	+24	60.87	February 9, 2020	November 8, 2020	2nd in Eastern Conference, 2nd Overall
MLS Cup Playoffs	1	0	0	1	0	1	−1	0.00	November 24, 2020		First round
Canadian Championship	Postponed until 2022										
MLS is Back Knockout Stage	1	0	0	1	1	3	−2	0.00	July 26, 2020		Round of 16
Total	25	14	5	6	45	24	+21	56.00			

Updated to match played November 24, 2020
Source: Competitions

=== Goals and assists ===
Goals
Rank	Nation	Name	Pos.	Major League Soccer	MLS Cup Playoffs	Canadian Championship	MLS is Back Knockout Stage	Total
1	(United States)	Ayo Akinola	FW	9	0	0	0	9
1	(Spain)	Alejandro Pozuelo	MF	9	0	0	0	9
3	(Canada)	Richie Laryea	DF	4	0	0	0	4
3	(Argentina)	Pablo Piatti	FW	4	0	0	0	4
5	(United States)	Jozy Altidore	FW	2	0	0	0	2
5	(United States)	Patrick Mullins	FW	1	0	0	1	2
7	(Nigeria)	Ifunanyachi Achara	FW	1	0	0	0	1
7	(United States)	Nick DeLeon	MF	1	0	0	0	1
7	(Japan)	Tsubasa Endoh	FW	1	0	0	0	1
7	(Canada)	Jonathan Osorio	MF	1	0	0	0	1
Own goals				0	0	0	0	0
Totals				33	0	0	1	34

Updated to match played November 8, 2020
Source: Toronto FC

Assists
Rank	Nation	Name	Pos.	Major League Soccer	MLS Cup Playoffs	Canadian Championship	MLS is Back Knockout Stage	Total
1	(Spain)	Alejandro Pozuelo	MF	10	0	0	0	10
2	(Canada)	Richie Laryea	DF	4	0	0	0	4
2	(Argentina)	Pablo Piatti	FW	4	0	0	0	4
4	(Canada)	Jonathan Osorio	MF	3	0	0	0	3
5	(United States)	Jozy Altidore	FW	1	0	0	1	2
5	(United States)	Nick DeLeon	MF	2	0	0	0	2
7	(Brazil)	Auro Jr.	DF	1	0	0	0	1
7	(United States)	Michael Bradley	MF	1	0	0	0	1
7	(United States)	Marky Delgado	MF	1	0	0	0	1
7	(Scotland)	Tony Gallacher	DF	1	0	0	0	1
7	(Democratic Republic of the Congo)	Chris Mavinga	DF	1	0	0	0	1
7	(United States)	Patrick Mullins	FW	1	0	0	0	1
Totals				30	0	0	1	31

Updated to match played November 8, 2020
Source: Toronto FC

=== Shutouts ===
Rank	Nation	Name	Pos.	Major League Soccer	MLS Cup Playoffs	Canadian Championship	MLS is Back Knockout Stage	Total
1	(United States)	Quentin Westberg	GK	6	0	0	0	6
2	(United States)	Alex Bono	GK	3	0	0	0	3
Totals				9	0	3	0	9

Updated to match played November 8, 2020
Source: Toronto FC

== Honours ==
=== MLS Team of the Week ===
Week	Starters	Bench	Coach	Opponent	Ref.
2	(Nigeria) Ifunanyachi Achara			New York City FC	
MLS is Back – Round 1	(United States) Ayo Akinola	(Spain) Alejandro Pozuelo		D.C. United	
MLS is Back – Round 2	(United States) Ayo Akinola (Canada) Richie Laryea (Spain) Alejandro Pozuelo			Montreal Impact	
6	(Argentina) Pablo Piatti	(Spain) Alejandro Pozuelo		Vancouver Whitecaps FC	
7 & 8		(Spain) Alejandro Pozuelo		Montreal Impact	
13		(United States) Alex Bono		New York City FC	
14	(Canada) Richie Laryea		(United States) Greg Vanney	Columbus Crew	
15	(Spain) Alejandro Pozuelo			Philadelphia Union	
16		(United States) Ayo Akinola (United States) Alex Bono		New England Revolution	
17	(United States) Eriq Zavaleta	(United States) Patrick Mullins		FC Cincinnati	
19	(Argentina) Pablo Piatti	(Canada) Richie Laryea		Atlanta United FC	
22		(Canada) Richie Laryea		Inter Miami CF	

=== MLS Player of the Week ===
Week	Player	Opponent	Ref.
14	(Canada) Richie Laryea	Columbus Crew	

=== MLS Goal of the Week ===
Week	Player	Opponent	Ref.
14	(Canada) Richie Laryea	Columbus Crew	

=== MLS Player of the Month ===
Month	Player	Month's Statline	Ref.
September	(Spain) Alejandro Pozuelo	4 Goals, 2 Assists	

=== End of Season awards ===
Award	Recipient(s)	Ref.
MLS MVP	(Spain) Alejandro Pozuelo	
MLS Best XI	(Spain) Alejandro Pozuelo	
