= 2021 Toronto FC season =

Toronto FC 2021 soccer season

Toronto FC
2021 season
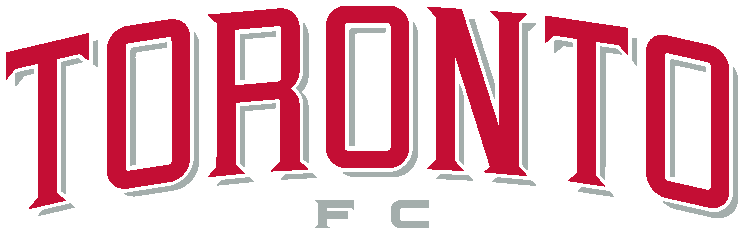
- Owner: Maple Leaf Sports & Entertainment
- President: Bill Manning
- Head coach: Chris Armas (until July 4); Javier Pérez (interim, from July 4)
- Stadium: BMO Field (from July 17); Exploria Stadium (Note: As a result of COVID-19 cross-border restrictions imposed by the Canadian government, Toronto FC temporarily played home matches at Exploria Stadium in Orlando, Florida.) (Orlando, Florida) (until July 16)
- Major League Soccer: Conference: 13th Overall: 26th
- MLS Cup playoffs: Did not qualify
- Canadian Championship: Runners-up
- CONCACAF Champions League: Quarter-finals
- Top goalscorer: League: Jozy Altidore; Jonathan Osorio (4 each); All: Jonathan Osorio (6)
- Biggest win: TOR 4–0 YOR (September 22, CC QF)
- Biggest defeat: DC 7–1 TOR (July 3)
Home colours	Away colours

The 2021 Toronto FC season was the 15th season in the history of Toronto FC.

Due to COVID-19 cross-border restrictions imposed by the Canadian government, Toronto FC, along with the two other Canadian MLS teams (CF Montréal and Vancouver Whitecaps FC), played in the United States at the beginning of the season while also sharing stadiums with other American MLS teams. From April 17 until July 16, Toronto FC played home matches at Orlando City SC's Exploria Stadium in Orlando, Florida. On July 14, MLS announced that Toronto FC would be allowed to play two home matches on July 17 and 21, although they continued to work with the Canadian Government regarding plans on future home matches.

Outside of the MLS season, Toronto finished as the runners-up of the 2021 Canadian Championship after losing the final to rivals CF Montréal 1–0. They also reached the quarter-finals of the 2021 CONCACAF Champions League.

== Squad ==
As of July 30, 2021.

No.	Player	Nationality	Position(s)	Date of birth (age)	Signed in	Previous club
Goalkeepers
16	Quentin Westberg	(United States) (France)	GK	April 25, 1986 (aged 35)	2019	(France) Auxerre
25	Alex Bono	(United States)	GK	April 25, 1994 (aged 27)	2015	(United States) Syracuse Orange
90	Kevin Silva	(United States)	GK	January 5, 1998 (aged 23)	2020	(Canada) Toronto FC II
Defenders
2	Justin Morrow	(United States)	LB / LWB / CB	October 4, 1987 (aged 34)	2014	(United States) San Jose Earthquakes
3	Eriq Zavaleta	(El Salvador) (United States)	CB	August 2, 1992 (aged 29)	2015	(United States) Seattle Sounders FC
5	Julian Dunn	(Canada)	CB	July 11, 2000 (aged 21)	2018	(Canada) Toronto FC II
12	Rocco Romeo (out on loan)	(Canada)	CB	March 25, 2000 (aged 21)	2020	(Canada) Toronto FC II
22	Richie Laryea	(Canada)	RB	January 7, 1995 (aged 26)	2019	(United States) Orlando City SC
23	Chris Mavinga	(Democratic Republic of the Congo) (France)	CB	May 26, 1991 (aged 30)	2017	(Russia) Rubin Kazan
26	Luke Singh	(Trinidad and Tobago) (Canada)	CB	September 12, 2000 (aged 21)	2021	(Canada) Toronto FC II
44	Omar Gonzalez	(United States)	CB	October 11, 1988 (aged 33)	2019	(Mexico) Pachuca
92	Kemar Lawrence	(Jamaica) (Note: Lawrence held a U.S. Green Card, so he counted as a domestic player for MLS purposes.)	LB	September 17, 1992 (aged 29)	2021	(Belgium) Anderlecht
96	Auro Jr.	(Brazil)	RB / RWB	January 23, 1996 (aged 25)	2018	(Brazil) São Paulo
Midfielders
4	Michael Bradley	(United States)	CM/DM	July 31, 1987 (aged 34)	2014	(Italy) Roma
8	Marky Delgado	(United States)	CM	May 16, 1995 (aged 26)	2015	(United States) Chivas USA
10	Alejandro Pozuelo	(Spain)	AM	September 20, 1991 (aged 30)	2019	(Belgium) Genk
14	Noble Okello	(Canada)	MF	July 20, 2000 (aged 21)	2019	(Canada) Toronto FC II
18	Nick DeLeon	(United States)	RB / RM / LM	July 17, 1990 (aged 31)	2018	(United States) D.C. United
21	Jonathan Osorio	(Canada)	AM / CM	June 12, 1992 (aged 29)	2013	(Canada) SC Toronto
27	Liam Fraser (out on loan)	(Canada)	DM	February 13, 1998 (aged 23)	2018	(Canada) Toronto FC II
31	Tsubasa Endoh	(Japan)	MF	August 20, 1993 (aged 28)	2019	(Canada) Toronto FC II
97	Ralph Priso	(Canada)	MF	August 2, 2002 (aged 19)	2020	(Canada) Toronto FC II
Forwards
6	Dom Dwyer	(United States)	FW	June 30, 1990 (aged 31)	2021	(United States) Orlando City SC
7	Jahkeele Marshall-Rutty	(Canada)	FW	June 16, 2004 (aged 17)	2020	(Canada) Toronto FC II
9	Erickson Gallardo	(Venezuela)	RW	July 26, 1996 (aged 25)	2019	(Venezuela) Zamora
11	Jayden Nelson	(Canada)	FW	September 26, 2002 (aged 19)	2020	(Canada) Toronto FC II
13	Patrick Mullins	(United States)	ST	February 5, 1992 (aged 29)	2019	(United States) Columbus Crew
17	Jozy Altidore	(United States)	CF	November 6, 1989 (aged 32)	2015	(England) Sunderland
20	Ayo Akinola	(Canada) (United States)	ST	January 20, 2000 (aged 21)	2018	(Canada) Toronto FC II
24	Jacob Shaffelburg	(Canada)	LW	November 26, 1999 (aged 22)	2019	(Canada) Toronto FC II
30	Yeferson Soteldo	(Venezuela)	LW	June 30, 1997 (aged 24)	2021	(Brazil) Santos
77	Jordan Perruzza	(Canada)	FW	January 16, 2001 (aged 20)	2021	(Canada) Toronto FC II
99	Ifunanyachi Achara	(Nigeria)	FW	September 28, 1997 (aged 24)	2020	(United States) Georgetown Hoyas

=== Roster slots ===
Toronto had six International roster slots and three Designated Player slots available for use in the 2021 season (players on the injured reserve did not take up an international slot). They traded an International roster spot for the 2021 season to FC Dallas in exchange for $225,000 of General Allocation Money (GAM) on April 20, 2021. They traded another international roster spot to Orlando City SC in exchange for $200,000 of General Allocation Money (GAM) on April 27, 2021.

International slots
Slot	Player	Nationality
1	Auro Jr.	Brazil
2	Ifunanyachi Achara	Nigeria
3	Tsubasa Endoh	Japan
4	Chris Mavinga	DR Congo
5	Alejandro Pozuelo	Spain
6	Yeferson Soteldo	Venezuela
7	Traded to Orlando City SC	
8	Traded to FC Dallas	
LOAN	Erickson Gallardo	Venezuela

Designated Player slots
Slot	Player
1	(United States) Jozy Altidore
2	(Spain) Alejandro Pozuelo
3	(Venezuela) Yeferson Soteldo

== Transfers ==
Note: All figures in United States dollars.

=== In ===
==== Transferred In ====
No.	Pos.	Player	From	Fee/notes	Date	Source
77	FW	(Canada) Jordan Perruzza	(Canada) Toronto FC II	Signed pre-contract on August 20, 2021, Homegrown signing	January 1, 2021	
5	DF	(Canada) Julian Dunn	(Canada) Valour FC	Return from loan	January 1, 2021	
14	MF	(Canada) Noble Okello	(Denmark) HB Køge	Return from loan	January 1, 2021	
26	DF	(Trinidad and Tobago) Luke Singh	(Canada) Toronto FC II	Homegrown signing	April 16, 2021	
30	LW	(Venezuela) Yeferson Soteldo	(Brazil) Santos	Designated Player, $6.5 million transfer fee	April 26, 2021	
92	DF	(Jamaica) Kemar Lawrence	(Belgium) Anderlecht	$600,000 transfer fee	May 7, 2021	
6	FW	(United States) Dom Dwyer	(United States) Orlando City SC		May 11, 2021	
12	DF	(Canada) Rocco Romeo	(Denmark) HB Køge	Return from loan	July 1, 2021	
77	FW	(Canada) Jordan Perruzza	(United States) San Antonio FC	Return from loan	July 16, 2021	

==== Loaned in ====
No.	Pos.	Player	From	Fee/notes	Date	Source
26	DF	(Trinidad and Tobago) Luke Singh	(Canada) Toronto FC II	Signed short-term loan	April 6, 2021	

==== MLS SuperDraft picks ====
2021 Toronto FC SuperDraft Picks
Round	Selection	Player	Position	College	Status
1	25	(United States) Matt Di Rosa	Left back	Maryland	Signed with (United States) Loudoun United on July 9
2	45	(England) Nathaniel Crofts	Forward	Virginia	Signed with (England) Stocksbridge Park Steels on July 28
3	64	(United States) Paul Rothrock	Midfielder	Georgetown	Signed with (Canada) Toronto FC II on May 18
3	72	(United States) Jon-Talen Maples	Defender	Southern Methodist University	Signed with (Canada) Toronto FC II on May 5

=== Out ===
==== Transferred out ====
No.	Pos.	Player	To	Fee/notes	Date	Source
7	RW	(Argentina) Pablo Piatti	(Spain) Elche	Option declined	November 30, 2020	
26	CB	(Belgium) Laurent Ciman	Retired	Out of contract	November 30, 2020	
6	LB	(Scotland) Tony Gallacher	(England) Liverpool	Loan ended	December 31, 2020	
19	FW	(United States) Griffin Dorsey	(United States) Houston Dynamo FC	Waived	May 11, 2021	

==== Loaned out ====
No.	Pos.	Player	Loaned to	Fee/notes	Date	Source
12	DF	(Canada) Rocco Romeo	(Denmark) HB Køge	Year long loan until June 2021	August 14, 2020	
27	MF	(Canada) Liam Fraser	(United States) Columbus Crew SC	Season long loan in exchange for $50,000 GAM	May 3, 2021	
77	FW	(Canada) Jordan Perruzza	(United States) San Antonio FC	Nine match loan	May 20, 2021	
12	DF	(Canada) Rocco Romeo	(Canada) Valour FC	Loan until December 2021	July 30, 2021	

== Pre-season and friendlies ==
=== Matches ===
March 27 Friendly	Toronto FC	3–0	Fort Lauderdale CF	Bay Lake, Florida
	Bradley; Pozuelo; Mullins	Report		Stadium: ESPN Wide World of Sports Complex

April 1 Friendly	Toronto FC	4–2	Columbus Crew	Bay Lake, Florida
7:00 PM EDT	Altidore 35'; Mullins 59'; Auro 64' (pen.); Perruzza 82'	Report	Pedro Santos 18'; Díaz 86'	Stadium: ESPN Wide World of Sports Complex

In-season

June 12 Friendly	Toronto FC	0–3	Inter Miami CF	Orlando, Florida
		Report	Carranza; Chapman	Stadium: Exploria Stadium

== Competitions ==
=== Major League Soccer ===
==== League tables ====
Eastern Conference

Pos	Team	Pld	Pts
10	CF Montréal	34	46
11	Inter Miami CF	34	41
12	Chicago Fire FC	34	34
13	Toronto FC	34	28
14	FC Cincinnati	34	20

Source: MLS

Overall

Pos	Team	Pld	Pts
23	FC Dallas	34	33
24	Austin FC	34	31
25	Houston Dynamo FC	34	30
26	Toronto FC	34	28
27	FC Cincinnati	34	20

Source: MLS

==== Summary ====
Overall								Home						Away					
Pld	W	D	L	GF	GA	GD	Pts	W	D	L	GF	GA	GD	W	D	L	GF	GA	GD
34	6	10	18	39	66	−27	28	4	7	6	24	27	−3	2	3	12	15	39	−24

==== Matches ====
April 17 1	CF Montréal	4–2	Toronto FC	Fort Lauderdale, Florida
2:00 PM EDT	Toye 3'; Quioto 24'; Wanyama 54', (yellow card) 67'; Mihailovic 71'	Report	Bradley (yellow card) 19'; Delgado 45' (pen.); Priso (yellow card) 45+1'; Laryea 88'	Stadium: DRV PNK Stadium; Attendance: 0 Referee: Ismail Elfath
Note: Montreal played as the home team for this match.

April 24 2	Toronto FC	2–2	Vancouver Whitecaps FC	Orlando, Florida
3:00 PM EDT	Singh 7'; Bradley (yellow card) 64'; Gonzalez (yellow card) 70'; Osorio 83'	Report	Gutiérrez (yellow card) 6'; Dájome 55' (pen.); Rose 70'	Stadium: Exploria Stadium; Attendance: 0 Referee: Jair Marrufo

May 8 3	New York Red Bulls	2–0	Toronto FC	Harrison, New Jersey
1:00 PM EDT	Gutman (yellow card) 31'; Amaya 32', (yellow card) 59'; Clark 69'	Report	Laryea (yellow card) 73'; Gonzalez (yellow card) 78'	Stadium: Red Bull Arena; Referee: Guido Gonzales Jr.

May 12 4	Toronto FC	2–0	Columbus SC	Orlando, Florida
7:00 PM EDT	Bradley 13'; Delgado (yellow card) 46'; Bono (yellow card) 54'; Altidore 87', (yellow card) 90+3'	Report	Keita (yellow card) 89'; Mensah (yellow card) 90+2'	Stadium: Exploria Stadium; Attendance: 0 Referee: Fotis Bazakos

May 15 5	New York City FC	1–1	Toronto FC	New York City, New York
1:00 PM EDT	Acevedo (yellow card) 30'; Jasson (yellow card) 42'; Medina 53'	Report	Mavinga (yellow card) 65'; Shaffelburg 74'	Stadium: Yankee Stadium; Referee: David Gantar

May 22 6	Orlando City SC	1–0	Toronto FC	Orlando, Florida
7:00 PM EDT	Akindele 12', (yellow card) 77'	Report	Soteldo (yellow card) 21'; Auro (yellow card) 63'	Stadium: Exploria Stadium; Attendance: 11,525; Referee: Victor Rivas

May 29 7	Columbus Crew	2–1	Toronto FC	Columbus, Ohio
3:00 PM EDT	Espinoza 12'; Zardes 21'	Report	Akinola 52'	Stadium: Historic Crew Stadium; Attendance: 5,700; Referee: Allen Chapman

June 19 8	Toronto FC	2–3	Orlando City SC	Orlando, Florida
7:30 PM EST	Akinola 10'; Osorio 39'; Delgado (yellow card) 64'; Gonzalez (yellow card) 67'; Laryea (yellow card) 90+7'	Report	Akindele 1'; Nani 8', (yellow card) 90+8'; Urso (yellow card) 70', (goal) 84'; Moutinho (yellow card) 75'	Stadium: Exploria Stadium; Attendance: 0 Referee: Armando Villarreal

June 23 9	Nashville SC	3–2	Toronto FC	Nashville, Tennessee
8:30 PM EDT	Godoy (yellow card) 32'; Muyl (yellow card) 41'; Maher 62'; Haakenson 83', 90+2', (yellow card) 90+3'	Report	Zavaleta (yellow card) 2'; Osorio 26'; Auro (yellow card) 53'; Bradley (yellow card) 69'; Mullins 81'	Stadium: Nissan Stadium; Attendance: 17,008; Referee: Ramy Touchan

June 26 10	Toronto FC	0–2	FC Cincinnati	Orlando, Florida
7:00 PM EDT	Bradley (yellow card) 33'	Report	Cruz 4'; Kubo (yellow card) 38'; Matarrita (yellow card) 62'; Acosta 68'; Cruz (yellow card) 78'	Stadium: Exploria Stadium; Attendance: 0 Referee: Rubiel Vazquez

July 3 11	D.C. United	7–1	Toronto FC	Washington, D.C.
5:30 PM EDT	Paredes 2'; Robertha 8'; Priso 21' (o.g.); Gressel (yellow card) 57'; Arriola 71'; Kamara 81'; Asad 85'; Yow 90'	Report	Gonzalez (yellow card) 35'; Akinola 39'; Osorio (yellow card) 45+2'; Zavaleta (yellow card) 75' (yellow-red card) 78'	Stadium: Audi Field; Attendance: 14,000; Referee: Lukasz Szpala

July 7 12	New England Revolution	2–3	Toronto FC	Foxborough, Massachusetts
8:32 PM EDT	Gil 56'; McNamara (yellow card) 75'; Buksa 78'	Report	Soteldo 9'; Lawrence 15'; Endoh 24'; Delgado (yellow card) 55'; Pozuelo (yellow card) 89'	Stadium: Gillette Stadium; Attendance: 8,434; Referee: Rosendo Mendoza
Note: The match was originally scheduled for 7:00 PM, but was postponed due to lightning.

July 17 13	Toronto FC	1–1	Orlando City SC	Toronto, Ontario
7:30 PM EDT	Altidore 72'; Bono (yellow card) 76'; Bradley (yellow card) 84'	Report	Schlegel (yellow card) 68'; Nani 77' (pen.); Perea (yellow card) 79'	Stadium: BMO Field; Attendance: 7,000; Referee: Marcos de Oliveira

July 21 14	Toronto FC	1–1	New York Red Bulls	Toronto, Ontario
7:30 PM EDT	Priso 62', (yellow card) 81'; Pozuelo (yellow card) 72'; Soteldo (yellow card) 90+2'	Report	Klimala 46'; Edwards (yellow card) 71'	Stadium: BMO Field; Attendance: 8,654; Referee: Silviu Petrescu

July 24 15	Chicago Fire FC	1–2	Toronto FC	Chicago, Illinois
8:00 PM EDT	Pineda (yellow card) 70'; Medrán 77'	Report	Soteldo 2'; DeLeon 76'; Singh (yellow card) 81'	Stadium: Soldier Field; Attendance: 12,288; Referee: Victor Rivas

August 1 16	Toronto FC	1–1	Nashville SC	Toronto, Ontario
7:30 PM EDT	Gonzalez 20'	Report	Castellanos 41'; McCarty (yellow card) 67'	Stadium: BMO Field; Attendance: 9,985; Referee: Fotis Bazakos

August 4 17	Philadelphia Union	3–0	Toronto FC	Chester, Pennsylvania
7:30 PM EDT	Glesnes 12', (yellow card) 26'; Gazdag 33' (pen.); Santos 36'; Wagner (yellow card) 47'; Mbaizo (yellow card) 90'	Report	Soteldo (penalty missed) 53'	Stadium: Subaru Park; Attendance: 14,303; Referee: Ted Unkel

August 7 18	Toronto FC	2–2	New York City FC	Toronto, Ontario
8:00 PM EDT	Soteldo (yellow card) 25'; Laryea (yellow card) 36', (goal) 49'; Pozuelo 55'; Priso (yellow card) 63'	Report	Rodríguez 12'; Tajouri-Shradi 21'; Morales (yellow card) 90+2'	Stadium: BMO Field; Attendance: 9,331; Referee: Robert Sibiga

August 14 19	Toronto FC	1–2	New England Revolution	Toronto, Ontario
8:00 PM EDT	Delgado (yellow card) 48'; Osorio 79'	Report	Buchanan 20'; Bye (yellow card) 63'; Bou 83' (pen.)	Stadium: BMO Field; Attendance: 13,144; Referee: Rubiel Vazquez

August 18 20	Atlanta United FC	1–0	Toronto FC	Atlanta, Georgia
7:00 PM EDT	Barco 20'	Report		Stadium: Mercedes-Benz Stadium; Attendance: 42,502; Referee: Alan Kelly

August 21 21	Inter Miami CF	3–1	Toronto FC	Fort Lauderdale, Florida
8:00 PM EDT	Pizarro 15', 48'; Figal (yellow card) 27'; Robinson 35', (yellow card) 51'; Gregore (yellow card) 61'	Report	Gibbs 62' (o.g.); Bradley (yellow card) 65'	Stadium: DRV PNK Stadium; Attendance: 14,897; Referee: Jair Marrufo

August 27 22	CF Montréal	3–1	Toronto FC	Montreal, Quebec
7:30 PM EDT	Struna (yellow card) 9'; Piette 23', (yellow card) 34'; Camacho (yellow card) 47'; Torres 68'; Quioto 75'	Report	Okello (red card) 5'; Achara 58'; Lawrence (yellow card) 60'; Gonzalez (yellow card) 74'	Stadium: Saputo Stadium; Referee: Drew Fischer

September 11 23	FC Cincinnati	2–0	Toronto FC	Cincinnati, Ohio
8:00 PM EDT	Brenner 39'; Medunjanin (yellow card) 45+3', (goal) 58'; Cameron (yellow card) 50'; Vallecilla (yellow card) 84'; Valot (yellow card) 85'	Report	Morrow (yellow card) 37'	Stadium: TQL Stadium; Attendance: 22,636; Referee: David Gantar

September 14 24	Toronto FC	0–1	Inter Miami CF	Toronto, Ontario
7:30 PM EDT	Mavinga (yellow card) 31'; Lawrence (red card) 37'; Laryea (yellow card) 61'; Delgado (yellow card) 67'	Report	Gregore (yellow card) 53'; Robinson (yellow card) 68'; González Pírez (yellow card) 72'; Makoun 90+5' (pen.)	Stadium: BMO Field; Attendance: 7,970; Referee: Ramy Touchan

September 18 25	Toronto FC	2–1	Nashville SC	Toronto, Ontario
7:30 PM EDT	Shaffelburg 18'; Bradley (yellow card) 39'; Gonzalez 79'	Report	Lovitz (yellow card) 32'; Sapong 74'	Stadium: BMO Field; Attendance: 9,892; Referee: Pierre-Luc Lauzière

September 25 26	Colorado Rapids	0–0	Toronto FC	Commerce City, Colorado
8:00 PM EDT	Kaye (yellow card) 45+2'	Report	Mullins (yellow card) 70'	Stadium: Dick's Sporting Goods Park; Attendance: 12,613; Referee: Michael Radchuk

September 29 27	Toronto FC	3–2	FC Cincinnati	Toronto, Ontario
7:00 PM EDT	Shaffelburg 48'; Delgado 55'; Achara (yellow card) 59', (goal) 65'; Soteldo (yellow card) 76'; Marshall-Rutty (yellow card) 90'	Report	Valot (yellow card) 32'; Matarrita 38'; Castillo (yellow card) 41'; Vallecilla (yellow card) 59'; Acosta 72'; Stanko (yellow card) 74'	Stadium: BMO Field; Attendance: 5,110; Referee: Silviu Petrescu

October 3 28	Toronto FC	3–1	Chicago Fire FC	Toronto, Ontario
4:00 PM EDT	Soteldo (yellow card) 9', (penalty missed) 36', 70'; Delgado 44'; Gonzalez 56'; Laryea (yellow card) 89'	Report	Berić 16'; Offor (yellow card) 86'	Stadium: BMO Field; Attendance: 6,624; Referee: Nima Saghafi

October 16 29	Toronto FC	0–2	Atlanta United FC	Toronto, Ontario
7:30 PM EDT	Achara (yellow card) 24'; Auro (red card) 83'; Delgado (yellow card) 90+2'	Report	Rossetto (yellow card) 16'; Luiz Araújo 45+2'; Barco (red card) 84'; Moreno 90+7'; Walkes (yellow card) 90+8'	Stadium: BMO Field; Attendance: 7,490; Referee: Tim Ford

October 20 30	Inter Miami CF	3–0	Toronto FC	Fort Lauderdale, Florida
7:30 PM EDT	F. Higuaín 10', (yellow card) 11'; Makoun 45'; Zavaleta 61' (o.g.); González Pírez (yellow card) 75'	Report		Stadium: DRV PNK Stadium; Attendance: 13,717; Referee: Armando Villarreal

October 23 31	Toronto FC	1–1	CF Montréal	Toronto, Ontario
7:30 PM EDT	Mullins (yellow card) 6'; Okello (yellow card) 53'; Osorio (yellow card) 57'; Shaffelburg (yellow card) 64'; Altidore 90+5'	Report	Ibrahim 55'; Maciel (yellow card) 58'	Stadium: BMO Field; Attendance: 8,095; Referee: Allen Chapman

October 27 32	Toronto FC	2–2	Philadelphia Union	Toronto, Ontario
7:30 PM EDT	Mavinga (yellow card) 57'; Altidore 66'; Elliott 70' (o.g.)	Report	Bedoya 1'; Santos 77'; Martínez (yellow card) 87'	Stadium: BMO Field; Attendance: 5,026; Referee: Silviu Petrescu

October 30 33	Atlanta United FC	1–1	Toronto FC	Atlanta, Georgia
6:00 PM EDT	Luiz Araújo 15'; Barco (yellow card) 56'	Report	DeLeon (yellow card) 17'; Lawrence (yellow card) 69'; Perruzza 88'	Stadium: Mercedes-Benz Stadium; Attendance: 43,372; Referee: Alex Chilowicz

November 7 34	Toronto FC	1–3	D.C. United	Toronto, Ontario
3:30 PM EST	Laryea 18'; Dwyer (yellow card) 74'	Report	Birnbaum 13', (yellow card) 90'; Kamara 30' (pen.), 36'; Felipe (yellow card) 65'; Pines (yellow card) 76'; Mora (yellow card) 85'	Stadium: BMO Field; Attendance: 11,166; Referee: Marcos de Oliveira

=== 2021 Canadian Championship ===
September 22 Quarter-finals	Toronto FC	4–0	York United	Toronto, Ontario
7:30 PM EDT	Delgado (yellow card) 30'; Osorio 34'; Achara 41'; Soteldo 84' (pen.); Okello 89'	Report	Petrasso (yellow card) 55'	Stadium: BMO Field; Attendance: 3,651; Referee: Juan Marquez

November 3 Semi-finals	Toronto FC	2–1	Pacific FC	Toronto, Ontario
7:30 PM EDT	Altidore 15'; Shaffelburg 26'; Laryea (yellow card) 78'	Report	Samake (yellow card) 35'; Aparicio (yellow card) 41'; Heard (yellow card) 62'; Hojabrpour (yellow card) 74'; Dixon (yellow card) 74'; Díaz 83'	Stadium: BMO Field; Attendance: 5,131; Referee: Pierre-Luc Lauzière

November 21 Final	CF Montréal	1–0	Toronto FC	Montreal, Quebec
1:00 PM EST	Torres (yellow card) 21'; Quioto 72'	Report	Laryea (yellow card) 36'; Soteldo (yellow card) 57'; Delgado (yellow card) 87'	Stadium: Saputo Stadium; Attendance: 12,000; Referee: David Gantar

=== CONCACAF Champions League ===
==== Round of 16 ====
April 7 First leg	León (Mexico)	1–1	(Canada) Toronto FC	León, Mexico
8:00 PM EDT	Navarro 25', (yellow card) 90+5'; Colombatto (yellow card) 56'; Ramírez (yellow card) 78'; Barreiro (yellow card) 78'	Report	Mosquera 51' (o.g.); Laryea (yellow card) 53'; Bradley (yellow card) 61'	Stadium: Estadio León; Attendance: 9,389; Referee: Ricardo Montero (Costa Rica)

April 14 Second leg	Toronto FC (Canada)	2–1 (3–2 agg.)	(Mexico) León	Bay Lake, United States
6:00 PM EDT	Delgado (yellow card) 44'; Mullins 55'; Morrow 72'; Laryea (yellow card) 73'; Priso (yellow card) 74'	Report	Moreno (yellow card) 70'; Navarro 80'	Stadium: ESPN Wide World of Sports Complex; Attendance: 0 Referee: John Pitti (Panama)

==== Quarter-finals ====
April 27 First leg	Toronto FC (Canada)	1–3	(Mexico) Cruz Azul	Tampa, United States
10:00 PM EDT	Zavaleta (yellow card) 18'; Osorio 20'	Report	Angulo 3', 34'; Escobar (yellow card) 31'; Aguilar 58'; Fernández (yellow card) 88'	Stadium: Raymond James Stadium; Attendance: 0 Referee: Ricardo Montero (Costa Rica)

May 4 Second leg	Cruz Azul (Mexico)	1–0 (4–1 agg.)	(Canada) Toronto FC	Mexico City, Mexico
10:15 PM EDT	Angulo 28'; Alvarado (yellow card) 41'	Report	Laryea (yellow card) 22'	Stadium: Estadio Azteca; Attendance: 0 Referee: Saíd Martínez (Honduras)

=== Competitions summary ===
Competition	Record								First Match	Last Match	Final Position
Competition	Pld	W	D	L	GF	GA	GD	Win %	First Match	Last Match	Final Position
MLS Regular Season	34	6	10	18	39	66	−27	17.65	April 17, 2021	November 7, 2021	13th in Eastern Conference, 26th Overall
Canadian Championship	3	2	0	1	6	2	+4	66.67	September 22, 2021	November 21, 2021	Runners-up
Champions League	4	1	1	2	4	6	−2	25.00	April 7, 2021	May 4, 2021	Quarter-finals
Total	41	9	11	21	49	74	−25	21.95			

Source: Competitions

=== Goals ===
Rank	Nation	Player	Major League Soccer	Canadian Championship	Champions League	Total
1	(Canada)	Jonathan Osorio	3	0	1	4
2	(Canada)	Ayo Akinola	3	0	0	3
3	(United States)	Jozy Altidore	2	0	0	2
3	(Canada)	Richie Laryea	2	0	0	2
3	(United States)	Patrick Mullins	1	0	1	2
3	(Venezuela)	Yeferson Soteldo	2	0	0	2
7	(United States)	Michael Bradley	1	0	0	1
7	(United States)	Nick DeLeon	1	0	0	1
7	(United States)	Marky Delgado	1	0	0	1
7	(Japan)	Tsubasa Endoh	1	0	0	1
7	(United States)	Omar Gonzalez	1	0	0	1
7	(Jamaica)	Kemar Lawrence	1	0	0	1
7	(United States)	Justin Morrow	0	0	1	1
7	(Spain)	Alejandro Pozuelo	1	0	0	1
7	(Canada)	Ralph Priso	1	0	0	1
7	(Canada)	Jacob Shaffelburg	1	0	0	1
7	(Trinidad and Tobago)	Luke Singh	1	0	0	1
Own goals			0	0	1	1
Totals			23	0	4	27

Updated to match played August 7, 2021
Source: https://www.torontofc.ca/stats/

=== Shutouts ===
As of November 2, 2021

Rank	Nation	Player	Pos.	Major League Soccer	Canadian Championship	Champions League	Total
1	(United States)	Alex Bono	GK	2	1	0	3
Totals				2	1	0	3
