= 2022 Toronto FC season =

Toronto FC 2022 soccer season

Toronto FC
2022 season
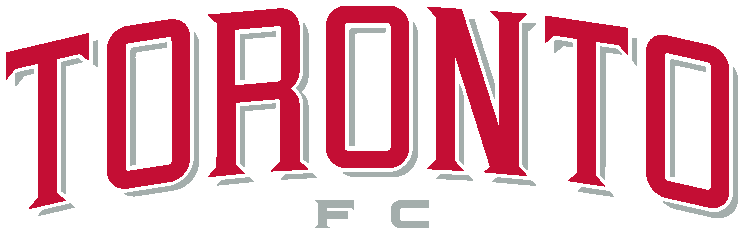
- Owner: Maple Leaf Sports & Entertainment
- President: Bill Manning
- Head coach: Bob Bradley
- Stadium: BMO Field
- Major League Soccer: Conference: 13th Overall: 27th
- MLS Cup playoffs: Did not qualify
- 2020 Canadian Championship: Winners
- 2022 Canadian Championship: Runners-up
- Top goalscorer: League: Jesús Jiménez; Jonathan Osorio (9 each); All: Jesús Jiménez; Jonathan Osorio (10 each)
- Highest home attendance: League/All: 29,130 (8/31 v. LA)
- Lowest home attendance: League: 20,809 (4/16 v. PHI); All: 18,133 (6/22 v. MTL, CC)
- Average home league attendance: 25,423
- Biggest win: TOR 4–0 MTL (June 22, CC SF); TOR 4–0 CLT (July 23)
- Biggest defeat: ORL 4–0 TOR (September 17); PHI 4–0 TOR (October 9)
Home colours	Away colours

The 2022 Toronto FC season was the 16th season in the history of Toronto FC.

== Squad ==
As of August 4, 2022

No.	Player	Nationality	Position(s)	Date of birth (age)	Signed in	Previous club
Goalkeepers
1	Greg Ranjitsingh	(Trinidad and Tobago) (Canada)	GK	July 18, 1993 (aged 29)	2022	(United States) MLS Pool
16	Quentin Westberg	(United States) (France)	GK	April 25, 1986 (aged 36)	2019	(France) Auxerre
25	Alex Bono	(United States)	GK	April 25, 1994 (aged 28)	2015	(United States) Syracuse Orange
Defenders
5	Lukas MacNaughton	(Canada) (United States)	CB	March 8, 1995 (aged 27)	2022	(Canada) Pacific FC
7	Jahkeele Marshall-Rutty	(Canada)	LB / RB	June 16, 2004 (aged 18)	2020	(Canada) Toronto FC II
12	Kadin Chung	(Canada)	RB	September 5, 1998 (aged 24)	2022	(Canada) Pacific FC
15	Doneil Henry	(Canada)	CB	April 20, 1993 (aged 29)	2022	(United States) Los Angeles FC
19	Richie Laryea (on loan)	(Canada)	RB	January 7, 1995 (aged 27)	2022	(England) Nottingham Forest
23	Chris Mavinga	(Democratic Republic of the Congo) (France)	CB	May 26, 1991 (aged 31)	2017	(Russia) Rubin Kazan
26	Luke Singh (out on loan)	(Trinidad and Tobago) (Canada)	CB	September 12, 2000 (aged 22)	2021	(Canada) Toronto FC II
27	Shane O'Neill	(United States) (Republic of Ireland)	CB	September 2, 1993 (aged 29)	2022	(United States) Seattle Sounders FC
38	Luca Petrasso	(Canada)	LB / LM	June 16, 2000 (aged 22)	2022	(Canada) Toronto FC II
44	Domenico Criscito	(Italy)	LB / CB	December 30, 1986 (aged 36)	2022	(Italy) Genoa
47	Kosi Thompson	(Canada)	RB / MF	January 27, 2003 (aged 19)	2022	(Canada) Toronto FC II
96	Auro Jr. (out on loan)	(Brazil)	RB / RWB	January 23, 1996 (aged 26)	2018	(Brazil) São Paulo
Midfielders
4	Michael Bradley	(United States)	CM/DM	July 31, 1987 (aged 35)	2014	(Italy) Roma
8	Mark-Anthony Kaye	(Canada)	MF	December 2, 1994 (aged 28)	2022	(United States) Colorado Rapids
14	Noble Okello	(Canada)	MF	July 20, 2000 (aged 22)	2019	(Canada) Toronto FC II
21	Jonathan Osorio	(Canada)	AM / CM	June 12, 1992 (aged 30)	2013	(Canada) SC Toronto
22	Jacob Shaffelburg (out on loan)	(Canada)	LW / LB	November 26, 1999 (aged 23)	2019	(Canada) Toronto FC II
81	Themi Antonoglou	(Canada)	MF	June 2, 2001 (aged 21)	2022	(Canada) Toronto FC II
Forwards
9	Jesús Jiménez	(Spain)	FW	November 5, 1993 (aged 29)	2022	(Poland) Górnik Zabrze
10	Federico Bernardeschi	(Italy)	RW	February 16, 1994 (aged 28)	2022	(Italy) Juventus
11	Jayden Nelson	(Canada)	FW	September 26, 2002 (aged 20)	2020	(Canada) Toronto FC II
20	Ayo Akinola	(Canada) (United States)	ST	January 20, 2000 (aged 22)	2018	(Canada) Toronto FC II
24	Lorenzo Insigne	(Italy)	LW	June 4, 1991 (aged 31)	2022	(Italy) Napoli
29	Deandre Kerr	(Canada)	FW	November 29, 2002 (aged 20)	2022	(United States) Syracuse Orange
77	Jordan Perruzza	(Canada)	FW	January 16, 2001 (aged 21)	2021	(Canada) Toronto FC II
83	Hugo Mbongue	(Canada)	FW	July 27, 2004 (aged 18)	2022	(Canada) Toronto FC II
99	Ifunanyachi Achara	(Nigeria)	FW	September 28, 1997 (aged 25)	2020	(United States) Georgetown Hoyas

=== Roster slots ===
Toronto had 6+3 international roster slots and three Designated Player slots available for use in the 2022 season. Beginning in 2022, MLS added three non-tradeable international roster spots to the Canadian franchises to compensate for the more complicated residency requirements compared to in the United States; players occupying these additional roster spots were required to have played and been registered with a Canadian MLS club for at least one full year. They traded an international roster spot along with the 2nd spot in the Allocation Order to New York Red Bulls in exchange for $575,000 in General Allocation Money. They traded another international roster spot to Nashville SC along with loaning Jacob Shaffelburg in exchange for $225,000 in General Allocation Money.

International slots
Slot	Player	Nationality
E1	Ifunanyachi Achara	Nigeria
E2	Chris Mavinga	DR Congo
E3		
R1	Federico Bernardeschi	Italy
R2	Domenico Criscito	Italy
R3	Lorenzo Insigne	Italy
R4	Jesús Jiménez	Spain
R5		
R6		
R7	Traded to Nashville SC	
R8	Traded to New York Red Bulls	

Designated Player slots
Slot	Player
1	(Italy) Lorenzo Insigne
2	(Italy) Federico Bernardeschi
3	

== Transfers ==
Note: All figures in United States dollars.

=== In ===
==== Transferred In ====
No.	Pos.	Player	From	Fee/notes	Date	Source
27	DF	(United States) Shane O'Neill	(United States) Seattle Sounders FC	Free agent	December 22, 2021	
38	DF	(Canada) Luca Petrasso	(Canada) Toronto FC II	Signed as a homegrown player from TFC II	January 11, 2022	
29	FW	(Canada) Deandre Kerr	(United States) Syracuse Orange	Signed as a homegrown player	January 21, 2022	
1	GK	(Trinidad and Tobago) Greg Ranjitsingh	(United States) MLS Pool	Free agent	January 21, 2022	
5	DF	(Canada) Lukas MacNaughton	(Canada) Pacific FC	Transfer	January 25, 2022	
3	DF	(Mexico) Carlos Salcedo	(Mexico) UANL	Transfer, Designated Player	January 31, 2022	
9	FW	(Spain) Jesús Jiménez	(Poland) Górnik Zabrze	Transfer, TAM signing	February 7, 2022	
12	DF	(Canada) Kadin Chung	(Canada) Pacific FC	Transfer	February 23, 2022	
47	MF	(Canada) Kosi Thompson	(Canada) Toronto FC II	Signed as a homegrown player	February 25, 2022	
81	MF	(Canada) Themi Antonoglou	(Canada) Toronto FC II	Signed as a homegrown player	May 7, 2022	
24	FW	(Italy) Lorenzo Insigne	(Italy) Napoli	Signed pre-contract on January 8, Designated Player	July 7, 2022	
44	DF	(Italy) Domenico Criscito	(Italy) Genoa	Signed June 29, TAM signing	July 7, 2022	
8	MF	(Canada) Mark-Anthony Kaye	(United States) Colorado Rapids	Traded for $775,000 GAM, $275,000 conditional GAM, 2023 Superdraft 1st round pick, a 2023 international roster spot and Ralph Priso	July 8, 2022	
10	FW	(Italy) Federico Bernardeschi	(Italy) Juventus	Signed July 15, Designated Player	July 15, 2022	
15	DF	(Canada) Doneil Henry	(United States) Los Angeles FC	Six-month contract	July 22, 2022	
83	FW	(Canada) Hugo Mbongue	(Canada) Toronto FC II	Signed as a homegrown player	September 13, 2022	

==== Loaned in ====
No.	Pos.	Player	From	Fee/notes	Date	Source
58	DF	(Canada) Kobe Franklin	(Canada) Toronto FC II	4-day loans (April 1, April 23, May 4, May 7)	April 1, 2022	
81	MF	(Canada) Themi Antonoglou	(Canada) Toronto FC II	4-day loans (April 15, April 23, April 29, May 4)	April 15, 2022	
51	DF	(South Africa) Adam Pearlman	(Canada) Toronto FC II	4-day loans (April 15, May 14, May 24)	April 15, 2022	
72	MF	(Canada) Steffen Yeates	(Canada) Toronto FC II	4-day loans (May 4, May 7)	May 4, 2022	
80	FW	(United States) Paul Rothrock	(Canada) Toronto FC II	4-day loans (May 4, May 7, May 14)	May 4, 2022	
35	MF	(Canada) Mehdi Essoussi	(Canada) Toronto FC II	4-day loans (May 21)	May 21, 2022	
19	DF	(Canada) Richie Laryea	(England) Nottingham Forest	One year loan	August 5, 2022	

==== MLS SuperDraft picks ====
2022 Toronto FC SuperDraft Picks
Round	Selection	Player	Position	College	Status
2	31	(Canada) Luka Gavran	Goalkeeper	St. John's	
3	59	(Canada) Reshaun Walkes	Forward	Texas–Rio Grande Valley	

=== Out ===
==== Transferred out ====
No.	Pos.	Player	To	Fee/notes	Date	Source
2	LB	(United States) Justin Morrow	Retired	Retired	November 30, 2021	
90	GK	(United States) Kevin Silva	(United States) Pittsburgh Riverhounds	Option declined	November 30, 2021	
12	CB	(Canada) Rocco Romeo	(Canada) Valour FC	Option declined	November 30, 2021	
44	CB	(United States) Omar Gonzalez	(United States) New England Revolution	Option declined	November 30, 2021	
13	ST	(United States) Patrick Mullins	Retired	Option declined	November 30, 2021	
5	CB	(Canada) Julian Dunn	(Norway) HamKam	Out of contract	November 30, 2021	
18	MF	(United States) Nick DeLeon		Out of contract	November 30, 2021	
27	MF	(Canada) Liam Fraser	(Belgium) Deinze	Out of contract	November 30, 2021	
31	MF	(Japan) Tsubasa Endoh	(Australia) Melbourne City	Out of contract	November 30, 2021	
9	RW	(Venezuela) Erickson Gallardo	(Venezuela) Zamora	Out of contract	November 30, 2021	
22	DF	(Canada) Richie Laryea	(England) Nottingham Forest	Undisclosed	January 8, 2022	
6	FW	(United States) Dom Dwyer	(United States) FC Dallas	Traded along with 2022 Superdraft 1st round pick (3rd overall) for $50,000 in GAM	January 10, 2022	
8	MF	(United States) Mark Delgado	(United States) LA Galaxy	Traded for $400,000 GAM and $100,000 conditional GAM	January 21, 2022	
30	LW	(Venezuela) Yeferson Soteldo	(Mexico) UANL	Transfer	January 31, 2022	
17	ST	(United States) Jozy Altidore	(United States) New England Revolution	Buy-out	February 14, 2022	
92	DF	(Jamaica) Kemar Lawrence	(United States) Minnesota United FC	Traded for rights to Sean O’Hearn and conditional $50,000 GAM	March 17, 2022	
10	MF	(Spain) Alejandro Pozuelo	(United States) Inter Miami CF	Traded for $150,000 GAM and additional conditional GAM	July 7, 2022	
8	MF	(Canada) Ralph Priso	(United States) Colorado Rapids	Traded along with $775,000 GAM, $275,000 conditional GAM, 2023 Superdraft 1st round pick and a 2023 international roster spot for Mark-Anthony Kaye	July 8, 2022	
3	DF	(Mexico) Carlos Salcedo	(Mexico) Juárez	Mutual contract termination	July 12, 2022	

==== Loaned out ====
No.	Pos.	Player	To	Fee/notes	Date	Source
96	RB	(Brazil) Auro Jr.	(Brazil) Santos	One-year loan with purchase option	February 14, 2022	
26	CB	(Trinidad and Tobago) Luke Singh	(Canada) FC Edmonton	One-year loan	March 3, 2022	
1	GK	(Trinidad and Tobago) Greg Ranjitsingh	(Canada) Toronto FC II	Loan to second team	April 8, 2022	
81	LM	(Canada) Themi Antonoglou	(Canada) Toronto FC II	Loan to second team	May 14, 2022	
8	MF	(Canada) Ralph Priso	(Canada) Toronto FC II	Loan to second team	June 11, 2022	
12	DF	(Canada) Kadin Chung	(Canada) Toronto FC II	Loan to second team	June 11, 2022	
77	FW	(Canada) Jordan Perruzza	(Canada) Toronto FC II	Loan to second team	June 11, 2022	
22	FW	(Canada) Jacob Shaffelburg	(Canada) Toronto FC II	Loan to second team	July 3, 2022	
22	FW	(Canada) Jacob Shaffelburg	(United States) Nashville SC	Loaned for 2022 season with purchase option, along with an International Roster Spot in exchange for $225,000 GAM	August 2, 2022	

== Pre-season ==
=== Matches ===
January 29 Friendly	LA Galaxy	5–4	Toronto FC	Carson, California
2:00 PM EST	Álvarez; Hernández (pen.); Cabral; Grandsir (pen.); Mutatu	Report	Nelson; Kerr; Perruzza	Stadium: Dignity Health Sports Park; Attendance: 0

February 2 Friendly	Los Angeles FC	1–2	Toronto FC	Irvine, California
4:00 PM EST	Ordaz 84'	Report	Achara 66'; Perruzza 74'	Stadium: Anteater Stadium; Attendance: 0 (closed-door)

February 9 Friendly	Austin FC	1–2	Toronto FC	Austin, Texas
1:00 PM EST	Urruti 33'	Report	Pozuelo 6' (pen.); Perruzza 38'	Stadium: St. David’s Performance Center

February 12 Friendly	Chicago Fire FC	0–1	Toronto FC	Austin, Texas
1:00 PM EST		TOR Report; CHI Report	Jiménez 55'	Stadium: St. David’s Performance Center

February 16 Friendly	Houston Dynamo	2–1	Toronto FC	Austin, Texas
1:00 PM EST	Ferreira 5'; Pasher 61'	TOR Report; HOU Report	Achara 74'	Stadium: St. David’s Performance Center

February 19 Friendly	Sporting Kansas City	1–1	Toronto FC	Austin, Texas
4:00 PM EST	Sallói 73'	Report	Mbongue 89'	Stadium: St. David’s Performance Center

== Competitions ==
=== Major League Soccer ===
==== League tables ====
Eastern Conference

Pos	Team	Pld	Pts
10	New England Revolution	34	42
11	Atlanta United FC	34	40
12	Chicago Fire FC	34	39
13	Toronto FC	34	34
14	D.C. United	34	27

Source: MLS

Overall

Pos	Team	Pld	Pts
24	Chicago Fire FC	34	39
25	Houston Dynamo FC	34	36
26	San Jose Earthquakes	34	35
27	Toronto FC	34	34
28	D.C. United	34	27

Source: MLS

==== Matches ====
February 26 1	FC Dallas	1–1	Toronto FC	Frisco, Texas
5:30 PM EST	Obrian 9', (yellow card) 45+2'	Report	Shaffelburg (yellow card) 19'; Osorio 45'	Stadium: Toyota Stadium; Attendance: 12,233; Referee: Jair Marrufo

March 5 2	Toronto FC	1–4	New York Red Bulls	Toronto, Ontario
2:00 PM EST	Jiménez 35'; Salcedo (yellow card) 61'	Report	Morgan 17', 24', 40'; D. Nealis (yellow card) 31'; Long 42'; Klimala (yellow card) 67'; S. Nealis (yellow card) 86'	Stadium: BMO Field; Attendance: 23,121; Referee: Rubiel Vazquez

March 12 3	Columbus Crew	2–1	Toronto FC	Columbus, Ohio
1:30 PM EST	Mensah (yellow card) 29'; Zelarayán 56'; Etienne 65'; Díaz (yellow card) 82'; Artur (yellow card) 84'	Report	Jiménez 14'; Nelson (yellow card) 64'; Priso (yellow card) 79'	Stadium: Lower.com Field; Attendance: 16,116; Referee: Ismail Elfath

March 19 4	Toronto FC	2–1	D.C. United	Toronto, Ontario
3:00 PM EDT	Pozuelo 24', (yellow card) 47'; Osorio 53', (yellow card) 55'; O'Neill (yellow card) 77'; MacNaughton (yellow card) 82'	Report	Canouse 10'; Flores (yellow card) 49'; Najar (yellow card) 72'; Yow (yellow card) 83'	Stadium: BMO Field; Attendance: 21,501; Referee: Ramy Touchan

April 2 5	Toronto FC	2–1	New York City FC	Toronto, Ontario
4:00 PM EDT	Jiménez 31'; Martins 43' (o.g.)	Report	Martins (yellow card) 59'; Callens (yellow card) 59'; Héber 90+2'	Stadium: BMO Field; Attendance: 21,802; Referee: Drew Fischer

April 9 6	Real Salt Lake	2–2	Toronto FC	Sandy, Utah
8:00 PM EDT	Meram 7'; Kreilach 43', (yellow card) 58'; Ruíz (yellow card) 47'; Herrera (yellow card) 83'	Report	Thompson 9'; MacNaughton (yellow card) 36'; Nelson 79'; Osorio (yellow card) 83'; Salcedo (red card) 86'	Stadium: Rio Tinto Stadium; Attendance: 20,136; Referee: Marcos de Oliveira

April 16 7	Toronto FC	2–1	Philadelphia Union	Toronto, Ontario
7:30 PM EDT	Nelson (yellow card) 19'; Pozuelo (yellow card) 30', (goal) 51'; Jiménez 39'; Bradley (yellow card) 45+1'; Chung (yellow card) 75'	Report	Carranza 34', (yellow card) 53'	Stadium: BMO Field; Attendance: 20,809; Referee: Alex Chilowicz

April 24 8	New York City FC	5–4	Toronto FC	New York, New York
5:00 PM EDT	Castellanos 38'; Acevedo (yellow card) 40'; Andrade 49'; Rodríguez 54'; Parks 58'; Pereira 75'; Morales (yellow card) 83' (yellow-red card) 89'	Report	Jiménez 13', 28', (yellow card) 44'; Kerr 86'; Bradley 90'	Stadium: Citi Field; Attendance: 17,626; Referee: Rubiel Vazquez

April 30 9	Toronto FC	1–2	FC Cincinnati	Toronto, Ontario
3:00 PM EDT	Jiménez 65'; Achara (yellow card) 86'	Report	Murphy 44'; Powell (yellow card) 50'; Acosta 52'	Stadium: BMO Field; Attendance: 23,591; Referee: Pierre-Luc Lauzière

May 4 10	FC Cincinnati	2–0	Toronto FC	Cincinnati, Ohio
7:30 PM EDT	Harris 2'; Acosta 57' (pen.); Nwobodo (yellow card) 59'; Blackett (yellow card) 75'; Barreal (yellow card) 88'	Report	Priso (red card) 6'; Nelson (yellow card) 12'	Stadium: TQL Stadium; Attendance: 19,563; Referee: Lukasz Szpala

May 8 11	Vancouver Whitecaps FC	1–0	Toronto FC	Vancouver, British Columbia
4:00 PM EDT	Cavallini (yellow card) 71'; Ricketts 90'	Report	O'Neill (yellow card) 11'; Pozuelo (penalty missed) 35'; Kerr (yellow card) 45+1'	Stadium: BC Place; Attendance: 17,709; Referee: Victor Rivas

May 14 12	Toronto FC	0–1	Orlando City SC	Toronto, Ontario
3:00 PM EDT	Bradley (yellow card) 42'	Report	Moutinho (yellow card) 71'; Shclegel (yellow card) 72'; Jansson (yellow card) 88'; Smith 90+2'	Stadium: BMO Field; Attendance: 26,146; Referee: Nima Saghafi

May 21 13	D.C. United	2–2	Toronto FC	Washington, DC
6:30 PM EDT	Flores 7'; Hines-Ike (yellow card) 16'; Alfaro (yellow card) 23'; Estrada 56'; B. Smith (yellow card) 84'; Durkin (yellow card) 90+3'	Report	Salcedo (yellow card) 10'; Akinola 36'; Jiménez (yellow card) 45+1'; Osorio (yellow card) 80', (goal) 89'	Stadium: Audi Field; Attendance: 18,320; Referee: Ismir Pekmic
Note: The match was originally scheduled for 4:00 PM, but was changed due to high temperature concerns.

May 28 14	Toronto FC	3–2	Chicago Fire FC	Toronto, Ontario
7:00 PM EDT	Kerr 13'; Pozuelo (yellow card) 31', (goal) 71' (pen.), 78'; Westberg (yellow card) 87'; Priso (yellow card) 88'	Report	Terán 52', (yellow card) 78'; Przybyłko (yellow card) 62', (goal) 66'; Shaqiri (yellow card) 75'	Stadium: BMO Field; Attendance: 25,906; Referee: Guido Gonzales Jr.

June 18 15	New York Red Bulls	2–0	Toronto FC	Harrison, New Jersey
7:00 PM EDT	Morgan 2'; D. Nealis (yellow card) 37'; Luquinhas 56'; Harper (yellow card) 89'	Report	Akinola (yellow card) 26'; O'Neill (yellow card) 31'; Salcedo (yellow card) 61'	Stadium: Red Bull Arena; Attendance: 19,142; Referee: Ramy Touchan

June 25 16	Toronto FC	2–1	Atlanta United FC	Toronto, Ontario
7:30 PM EDT	Osorio 8'; Nelson (yellow card) 28'; Salcedo (yellow card) 52'; Priso 78'	Report	Moreno (yellow card) 54'; Luiz Araújo 57', (yellow card) 70'	Stadium: BMO Field; Attendance: 25,527; Referee: Jon Freemon

June 29 17	Toronto FC	1–2	Columbus Crew	Toronto, Ontario
7:30 PM EDT	Thompson (yellow card) 37'; Jiménez 54'; Osorio (yellow card) 66'	Report	Zawadzki 18'; Nagbe 30'; Russell-Rowe (yellow card) 66'; Igbekeme (yellow card) 90+2'	Stadium: BMO Field; Attendance: 21,289; Referee: Armando Villarreal

July 2 18	Toronto FC	0–2	Seattle Sounders FC	Toronto, Ontario
7:30 PM EDT	Salcedo (yellow card) 31'	Report	Léo Chú (yellow card) 14'; Nouhou (yellow card) 34'; Teves 39'; Montero 60'; Lodeiro (yellow card) 70'; Leyva (yellow card) 90+2'	Stadium: BMO Field; Attendance: 23,594; Referee: Silviu Petrescu

July 9 19	Toronto FC	2–2	San Jose Earthquakes	Toronto, Ontario
7:30 PM EDT	Kerr 71', (yellow card) 86'; Osorio 75'	Report	Ebobisse 26'; Skahan 90+2'; Yueill (yellow card) 90+5'	Stadium: BMO Field; Attendance: 27,149; Referee: Fotis Bazakos

July 13 20	Chicago Fire FC	2–0	Toronto FC	Chicago, Illinois
8:00 PM EDT	Durán 4', 16'; Mueller (yellow card) 45+1'; Gutiérrez (yellow card) 64'	Report	O'Neill (yellow card) 34'; MacNaughton (yellow card) 37'; Criscito (yellow card) 65'; Nelson (yellow card) 90+4'	Stadium: Soldier Field; Attendance: 10,450; Referee: Lukasz Szpala

July 16 21	CF Montréal	1–0	Toronto FC	Montreal, Quebec
7:30 PM EDT	Miller (yellow card) 57' (yellow-red card) 81'; MacNaughton 69' (o.g.); Brault-Guillard (yellow card) 87'	Report	Bradley (yellow card) 46'	Stadium: Saputo Stadium; Attendance: 19,619; Referee: Ted Unkel

July 23 22	Toronto FC	4–0	Charlotte FC	Toronto, Ontario
7:30 PM EDT	Osorio 4'; Bradley 10', 45+2'; Bernardeschi 31'; Kaye (yellow card) 67'	Report	Fuchs (red card) 65'	Stadium: BMO Field; Attendance: 29,067; Referee: Filip Dujic

July 30 23	New England Revolution	0–0	Toronto FC	Foxborough, Massachusetts
8:00 PM EDT		Report	Insigne (penalty missed) 81'	Stadium: Gillette Stadium; Attendance: 29,097; Referee: Ismir Pekmic

August 6 24	Nashville SC	3–4	Toronto FC	Nashville, Tennessee
8:00 PM EDT	McCarty (yellow card) 2'; Davis (yellow card) 24'; Mukhtar 41' (pen.); Bunbury 45+4'; Sapong (yellow card) 61'; Zimmerman 84'	Report	Osorio 19', 44'; Laryea (yellow card) 40'; Bernardeschi 54' (pen.); Marshall-Rutty (yellow card) 71'; Insigne 77'	Stadium: Geodis Park; Attendance: 26,326; Referee: Allen Chapman

August 13 25	Toronto FC	3–1	Portland Timbers	Toronto, Ontario
7:30 PM EDT	MacNaughton (yellow card) 14'; Osorio 41', (yellow card) 68'; Mavinga (yellow card) 67'; Insigne 79'; Bernardeschi 85', (yellow card) 87'	Report	Van Rankin 73'	Stadium: BMO Field; Attendance: 28,598; Referee: Nima Saghafi

August 17 26	Toronto FC	2–2	New England Revolution	Toronto, Ontario
7:30 PM EDT	Bernardeschi 31' (pen.); Akinola (yellow card) 35'; Criscito 75'; Laryea (yellow card) 78'	Report	Makoun (yellow card) 29'; McNamara 37'; Rennicks 48'	Stadium: BMO Field; Attendance: 28,464; Referee: Fotis Bazakos

August 20 27	Inter Miami CF	2–1	Toronto FC	Fort Lauderdale, Florida
8:00 PM EDT	Jean Mota 2'; Lassiter 44'	Report	Insigne 28'; Bernardeschi (yellow card) 56'	Stadium: DRV PNK Stadium; Attendance: 14,388; Referee: Pierre-Luc Lauzière

August 28 28	Charlotte FC	0–2	Toronto FC	Charlotte, North Carolina
8:10 PM EDT	Fuchs (yellow card) 10'; Jóźwiak (yellow card) 83'	Report	Insigne 49'; Bernardeschi 66'	Stadium: Bank of America Stadium; Attendance: 32,495; Referee: Tim Ford
Note: The match was originally scheduled for 7:00 PM, but was postponed due to lightning.

August 31 29	Toronto FC	2–2	LA Galaxy	Toronto, Ontario
7:30 PM EDT	MacNaughton (yellow card) 51'; Jiménez 62'; Bernardeschi 81' (pen.)	Report	Brugman (yellow card) 15'; Douglas Costa 24'; Araujo (yellow card) 84'; Puig 89'	Stadium: BMO Field; Attendance: 29,130; Referee: Ted Unkel

September 4 30	Toronto FC	3–4	CF Montréal	Toronto, Ontario
7:30 PM EDT	Bernardeschi 5' (pen.), (yellow card) 83'; Insigne 7', 90+3'; Criscito (yellow card) 23'; Laryea (yellow card) 45+4'	Report	Miller 19'; Mihailovic 21'; Kamara 43'; Choinière (yellow card) 45+1'; Johnston 54'; Quioto (yellow card) 74'; Toye (yellow card) 83'	Stadium: BMO Field; Attendance: 28,793; Referee: Allen Chapman

September 10 31	Atlanta United FC	4–2	Toronto FC	Atlanta, Georgia
7:30 PM EDT	Luiz Araújo (penalty missed) 12'; Hernández (yellow card) 39'; Almada (yellow card) 45+1', (goal) 74'; Purata 47', 62', 88'; Mosquera (yellow card) 76'; Cisneros (yellow card) 90+3'	Report	Criscito (yellow card) 45+4'; Akinola 52'; Nelson (yellow card) 53'; Bernardeschi 67' (pen.); Laryea (yellow card) 77'	Stadium: Mercedes-Benz Stadium; Attendance: 42,670; Referee: Rosendo Mendoza

September 17 32	Orlando City SC	4–0	Toronto FC	Orlando, Florida
7:30 PM EDT	Torres 9'; Kara 22'; Moutinho (yellow card) 38'; MacNaughton 47' (o.g.); Akindele 84'	Report	Criscito (yellow card) 32'; MacNaughton (yellow card) 82'; Bernardeschi (yellow card) 90'	Stadium: Exploria Stadium; Attendance: 17,189; Referee: Nima Saghafi

September 30 33	Toronto FC	0–1	Inter Miami CF	Toronto, Ontario
7:30 PM EDT	Insigne (yellow card) 45+3'; Bradley (yellow card) 49'; Laryea (yellow card) 57'	Report	Campana (yellow card) 32'; Gregore (yellow card) 40'; Higuaín 86'	Stadium: BMO Field; Attendance: 27,703; Referee: Silviu Petrescu

October 9 34	Philadelphia Union	4–0	Toronto FC	Chester, Pennsylvania
2:30 PM EDT	Gazdag 4', 60' (pen.), 63'; Uhre 42'	Report	Bradley (yellow card) 29'; Mavinga (yellow card) 65'; Bernardeschi (yellow card) 81'	Stadium: Subaru Park; Attendance: 19,228; Referee: Lukasz Szpala

=== 2020 Canadian Championship ===
June 4, 2022 Final	Forge FC	1–1 (4–5 p)	Toronto FC	Hamilton, Ontario
7:00 PM EDT	Achinioti-Jönsson (yellow card) 25'; Owolabi-Belewu (yellow card) 55'; Borges 60', (yellow card) 67'; Morgan (yellow card) 77'; Hojabrpour (yellow card) 81'	Report	Petrasso (yellow card) 19'; MacNaughton (yellow card) 24'; Pozuelo 57', (yellow card) 62'; Akinola (yellow card) 69'	Stadium: Tim Hortons Field; Attendance: 13,715; Referee: Silviu Petrescu
	Penalties
	Achinioti-Jönsson (penalty scored); Campbell (penalty scored); Pacius (penalty scored); Bekker (penalty missed); Choinière (penalty scored); Poku (penalty missed)		(penalty scored) Jiménez; (penalty scored) Salcedo; (penalty missed) Kerr; (penalty scored) Pozuelo; (penalty scored) Perruzza; (penalty scored) Thompson

=== 2022 Canadian Championship ===
May 24 Quarter-finals	HFX Wanderers FC	1–2	Toronto FC	Halifax, Nova Scotia
6:00 PM EST	Rampersad (yellow card) 53'; Salter 69'	Report	Priso (yellow card) 23'; O'Neill (yellow card) 53'; Bradley 55'; Osorio 87'; Akinola (yellow card) 90+1'	Stadium: Wanderers Grounds; Attendance: 6,507; Referee: Juan Marquez

June 22 Semi-finals	Toronto FC	4–0	CF Montréal	Toronto, Ontario
7:00 PM EST	Akinola 40', 54'; Jiménez 75'; Pozuelo 78'	Report	Camacho (yellow card) 67'; Torres (yellow card) 84'; Miljevic (yellow card) 88'	Stadium: BMO Field; Attendance: 18,133; Referee: Yusri Rudolf

July 26 Final	Vancouver Whitecaps FC	1–1 (5–3 p)	Toronto FC	Vancouver
10:00 PM EDT	White 19'	Report	Bradley (yellow card) 69'; MacNaughton 75'	Stadium: BC Place; Attendance: 24,307; Referee: Pierre-Luc Lauzière
	Penalties
	Gauld (penalty scored); White (penalty scored); Gressel (penalty scored); Cubas (penalty scored); Blackmon (penalty scored)		(penalty scored) Criscito; (penalty scored) Perruzza; (penalty missed) Osorio; (penalty scored) Bernardeschi

=== Competitions summary ===
Competition	Record								First Match	Last Match	Final Position
Competition	G	W	D	L	GF	GA	GD	Win %	First Match	Last Match	Final Position
MLS Regular Season	34	9	7	18	49	66	−17	26.47	February 26	October 9	13th in Eastern Conference, 27th Overall
2020 Canadian Championship	1	0	1	0	1	1	+0	0.00	June 4		Champions
2022 Canadian Championship	3	2	1	0	7	2	+5	66.67	May 24	July 26	Runners-up
Total	38	11	9	18	57	69	−12	28.95			

Source: Competitions

== Statistics ==
=== Goals ===
Goals
Rank	Nation	Player	Pos.	Major League Soccer	MLS Cup Playoffs	Canadian Championship	Total
1	(Canada)	Jonathan Osorio	MF	9	—	1	10
1	(Spain)	Jesús Jiménez	FW	9	—	1	10
3	(Italy)	Federico Bernardeschi	FW	8	—	0	8
4	(Italy)	Lorenzo Insigne	FW	6	—	0	6
4	(Spain)	Alejandro Pozuelo (Note: No longer on roster)	MF	4	—	2	6
6	(United States)	Michael Bradley	MF	3	—	1	4
6	(Canada)	Ayo Akinola	FW	2	—	2	4
8	(Canada)	Deandre Kerr	MF	3	—	0	3
9	(Canada)	Jayden Nelson	FW	1	—	0	1
9	(Canada)	Ralph Priso	MF	1	—	0	1
9	(Canada)	Kosi Thompson	MF	1	—	0	1
9	(Canada)	Lukas MacNaughton	DF	0	—	1	1
9	(Italy)	Domenico Criscito	DF	1	—	0	1
Own goals				1	—	0	1
Totals				49	—	8	57

Updated to match played September 11, 2022
Source: Toronto FC Stats

=== Shutouts ===
Rank	Nation	Player	Pos.	Major League Soccer	MLS Cup Playoffs	Canadian Championship	Total
1	(United States)	Alex Bono	GK	3	—	0	3
2	(United States)	Quentin Westberg	GK	0	—	1	1
Totals				3	—	1	4

Updated to match played August 27, 2022
