= Jahkeele Marshall-Rutty =

Canadian soccer player (born 2004)

- Marshall-Rutty with the New York Red Bulls in 2026

Personal information
- Full name: Jahkeele Stanford Jack Marshall-Rutty
- Date of birth: June 16, 2004 (age 22)
- Place of birth: Brampton, Ontario, Canada
- Height: 1.71 m (5 ft 7 1/2 in)
- Positions: Full-back; winger

Team information
- Current team: New York Red Bulls
- Number: 3

Youth career
- Brampton East SC
- Rush Canada
- 2016–2019: Toronto FC

Senior career*
Years	Team	Apps	(Gls)
2019	Toronto FC II	3	(0)
2020–2024	Toronto FC	73	(1)
2021–2023	→ Toronto FC II (loan)	10	(2)
2024–2026	CF Montréal	15	(0)
2025	→ Charlotte FC (loan)	24	(0)
2026–	New York Red Bulls	30	(1)

International career^{‡}
2019	Canada U15	5	(1)
2026	Canada B	1	(0)
2026–	Canada	1	(0)
- * Club domestic league appearances and goals as of November 7, 2026 ‡ National team caps and goals as of March 31, 2026

Jahkeele Stanford Jack Marshall-Rutty (born June 16, 2004) is a Canadian professional soccer player who plays as a defender for Major League Soccer club New York Red Bulls and the Canada national team.

== Early life ==
Marshall-Rutty began playing youth soccer with Brampton East SC when he was seven. He later moved to the Rush Canada Academy. He began playing for Toronto FC Academy in the USSDA in the 2016–2017 season, playing for the U13 team. He has since played for the U15, U16/17 and U18/19 teams as well.

== Club career ==
=== Toronto FC ===
Marshall-Rutty signed with Toronto FC II on December 17, 2018, becoming the youngest homegrown player to sign with the club. He made his professional debut for Toronto FC II in USL League One on June 28, 2019, coming on as an 86th minute substitute for Jordan Faria against Forward Madison FC.

Marshall-Rutty moved to Toronto FC's MLS side on January 22, 2020. He became the youngest player to sign a first-team contract with the club at age 15. He made his debut on October 24, coming on as a substitute for Alejandro Pozuelo against the Philadelphia Union, becoming the youngest player to ever play for the team. He was loaned to the second team for some matches in 2021. He scored his first goal for Toronto FC II, on June 19, against Fort Lauderdale CF.

In December 2021, Marshall-Rutty trained with Premier League club Liverpool. Prior to this, he trained with Arsenal.

Over the next few seasons, Marshall-Rutty featured regularly for Toronto FC. On March 16, 2024 he scored his first league goal for Toronto in a 2-1 loss to New York City FC.

=== CF Montréal ===
In August 2024, he was traded to rivals CF Montréal in exchange for $850,000 in General Allocation Money, with add-ons up to a total of $1.3 million with Toronto retaining a sell-on clause. In 15 appearances with the club, Marshall-Rutty did not score a goal.

=== Loan to Charlotte FC ===
In April 2025, Marshall-Rutty was loaned to fellow MLS side Charlotte FC for the remainder of the 2025 season. At the end of the season, Charlotte announced the loan did not include an option to buy and he would be returning to CF Montréal.

== International career ==
Marshall-Rutty received his first international call-up to the Canada National under-15 team for the 2019 CONCACAF Boys' Under-15 Championship.

In January 2021, he received his first call-up to the senior national team for a team camp, becoming the youngest player to ever be called up to the senior team, breaking the record of Alphonso Davies by five days. In August 2025, Marshall-Rutty was called up to the for a pair of friendlies against Romania and Wales in September.

== Personal life ==
Born in Canada, Marshall-Rutty is of Jamaican, German, and Miꞌkmaq descent, with roots to the Membertou First Nation.

== Career statistics ==
=== Club ===
As of match played November 7, 2026

Appearances and goals by club, season and competition
Club	Season	League			Playoffs		National cup (Note: Includes Canadian Championship, U.S. Open Cup)		Continental		Other		Total	
Club	Season	Division	Apps	Goals	Apps	Goals	Apps	Goals	Apps	Goals	Apps	Goals	Apps	Goals
Toronto FC II	2019	USL League One	3	0	—		—		—		—		3	0
Toronto FC	2020	Major League Soccer	1	0	0	0	0	0	—		—		1	0
Toronto FC	2021	Major League Soccer	11	0	—		1	0	0	0	—		12	0
Toronto FC	2022	Major League Soccer	17	0	—		1	0	—		—		18	0
Toronto FC	2023	Major League Soccer	22	0	—		1	0	—		2 (Note: Appearances in Leagues Cup)	0	25	0
Toronto FC	2024	Major League Soccer	22	1	—		3	0	—		2	0	27	1
Toronto FC	Total		73	1	0	0	6	0	0	0	4	0	83	1
Toronto FC II (loan)	2021	USL League One	7	1	—		—		—		—		7	1
Toronto FC II (loan)	2023	MLS Next Pro	3	1	—		—		—		—		3	1
Toronto FC II (loan)	Total		10	2	0	0	0	0	0	0	0	0	10	2
CF Montréal	2024	Major League Soccer	9	0	1	0	—		—		—		10	0
CF Montréal	2025	Major League Soccer	6	0	—		0	0	—		—		6	0
CF Montréal	Total		15	0	1	0	0	0	—		—		16	0
Charlotte FC (loan)	2025	Major League Soccer	24	0	0	0	2	0	—		3	0	29	0
New York Red Bulls	2026	Major League Soccer	30	1	—		2	0	—		—		32	1
Career total			155	4	1	0	10	0	0	0	7	0	173	4

=== International ===
As of match played March 31, 2026

Appearances and goals by national team and year
National team	Year	Apps	Goals
Canada
Canada	2026	1	0
Total		1	0
