= Ayo Akinola =

Canadian soccer player (born 2000)

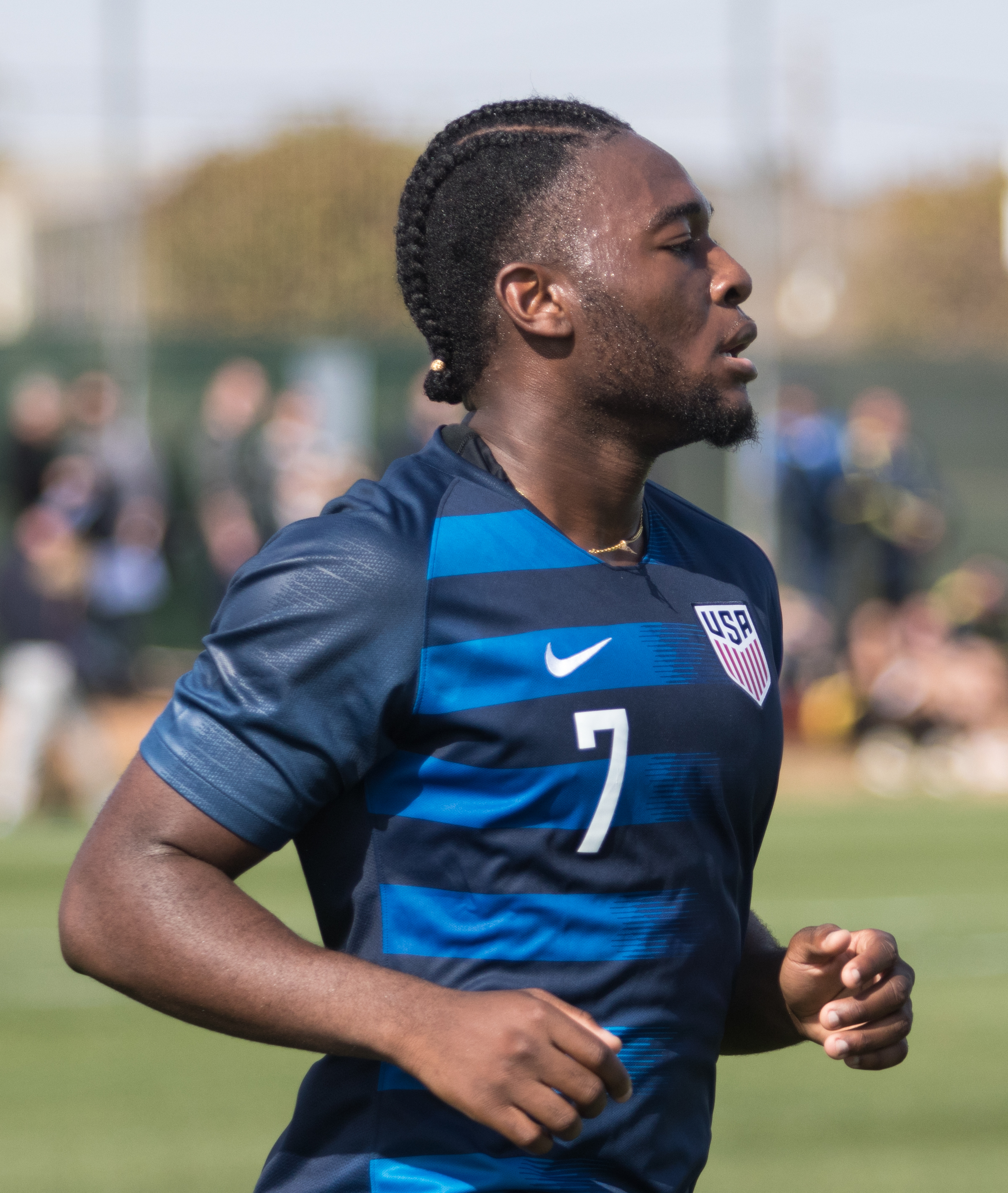
- Akinola with the United States U20 in 2019

Personal information
- Full name: Ayomide Bamidele Akinola
- Birth name: Grant Jesus-Sultan-Akinola Ogundimu
- Date of birth: January 20, 2000 (age 26)
- Place of birth: Detroit, Michigan, United States
- Height: 1.77 m (5 ft 10 in)
- Position: Forward

Team information
- Current team: Lausanne Ouchy
- Number: 12

Youth career
- 2008–2014: Brampton East SC
- 2015–2017: Toronto FC

Senior career*
Years	Team	Apps	(Gls)
2016	Toronto FC II	10	(2)
2018–2024	Toronto FC	83	(15)
2018–2023	→ Toronto FC II (loan)	25	(6)
2023	→ San Jose Earthquakes (loan)	7	(0)
2024–2025	Wil	31	(10)
2025–2026	Vaduz	18	(4)
2026–	Lausanne Ouchy	3	(0)

International career^{‡}
2015	United States U15	7	(5)
2015–2017	United States U17	32	(24)
2018–2019	United States U20	12	(9)
2020	United States	1	(1)
2021–2023	Canada	4	(0)
- * Club domestic league appearances and goals as of September 20, 2026 ‡ National team caps and goals as of March 28, 2023

Ayomide Bamidele Akinola (born January 20, 2000) is a professional soccer player who plays as a forward for Swiss Challenge League club Lausanne Ouchy. Born in the United States, he chose to represent the Canada national team in 2021.

== Early life ==
Akinola was born in Detroit, Michigan, and moved to Brampton, Ontario in 2005. As a teenager, he played in the TFC Academy. He graduated from St. Marguerite d'Youville Secondary School in 2018.

== Club career ==
=== Toronto FC II ===
Akinola was called up to the Toronto FC II set-up for the 2016 USL season. On June 15, 2016, he made his debut as an 80th-minute substitute for Shaan Hundal in a 1–1 draw with FC Montreal. Akinola made his first start a week later in a 4–1 defeat to Louisville City. On July 11, he scored a brace in a 4–2 win against the Harrisburg City Islanders and was named to the USL Team of the Week. He finished the season with two goals from 10 appearances.

Akinola tried out for Eredivisie club PSV Eindhoven in November 2017.

=== Toronto FC ===
On December 18, 2017, Akinola signed as a homegrown player with Major League Soccer side Toronto FC. He became the 15th player to graduate from the TFC Academy and sign for the first team, and the 34th academy graduate to sign a professional contract for one of the Toronto FC teams. On March 17, 2019, Akinola scored his first ever MLS goal in Toronto FC's home opener against the New England Revolution.

Akinola scored his second and third MLS goals for Toronto on July 13, 2020, in the MLS is Back Tournament in a 2–2 draw against D.C. United. He scored a hat-trick in his team's second game of the tournament against the Montreal Impact. He finished the 2020 season as the co-leading scorer for Toronto with Alejandro Pozuelo, both of whom scored 9 goals, although Pozuelo played nearly twice as many minutes.

In July 2021, Akinola had an ACL injury while on international duty with Canada, resulting in him missing the remainder of the 2021 season. In January 2022, Akinola would sign a contract extension with Toronto through the 2024 season, with an option for 2025.

In July 2023, he was loaned to fellow MLS side San Jose Earthquakes for the remainder of the 2023 season, with San Jose holding a purchase option.

In May 2024, he agreed to a mutual termination of his contract.

=== Europe ===
In July 2024, Akinola signed with Swiss Challenge League club Wil on a one-year contract. In August 2025, he joined Liechtenstein club Vaduz, who also play in the Swiss Challenge League.

== International career ==
Akinola was eligible to play internationally for the United States, Canada, and Nigeria, due to birth, residency, and heritage, respectively. While he was playing for the United States youth teams, both the Canadian Soccer Association and the Nigeria Football Federation had reached out to Akinola regarding his future at the senior international level. In 2018, Akinola commented "No time to rush. But at some point, I'm going to have to make a decision which one is the best fit for me."

=== United States ===
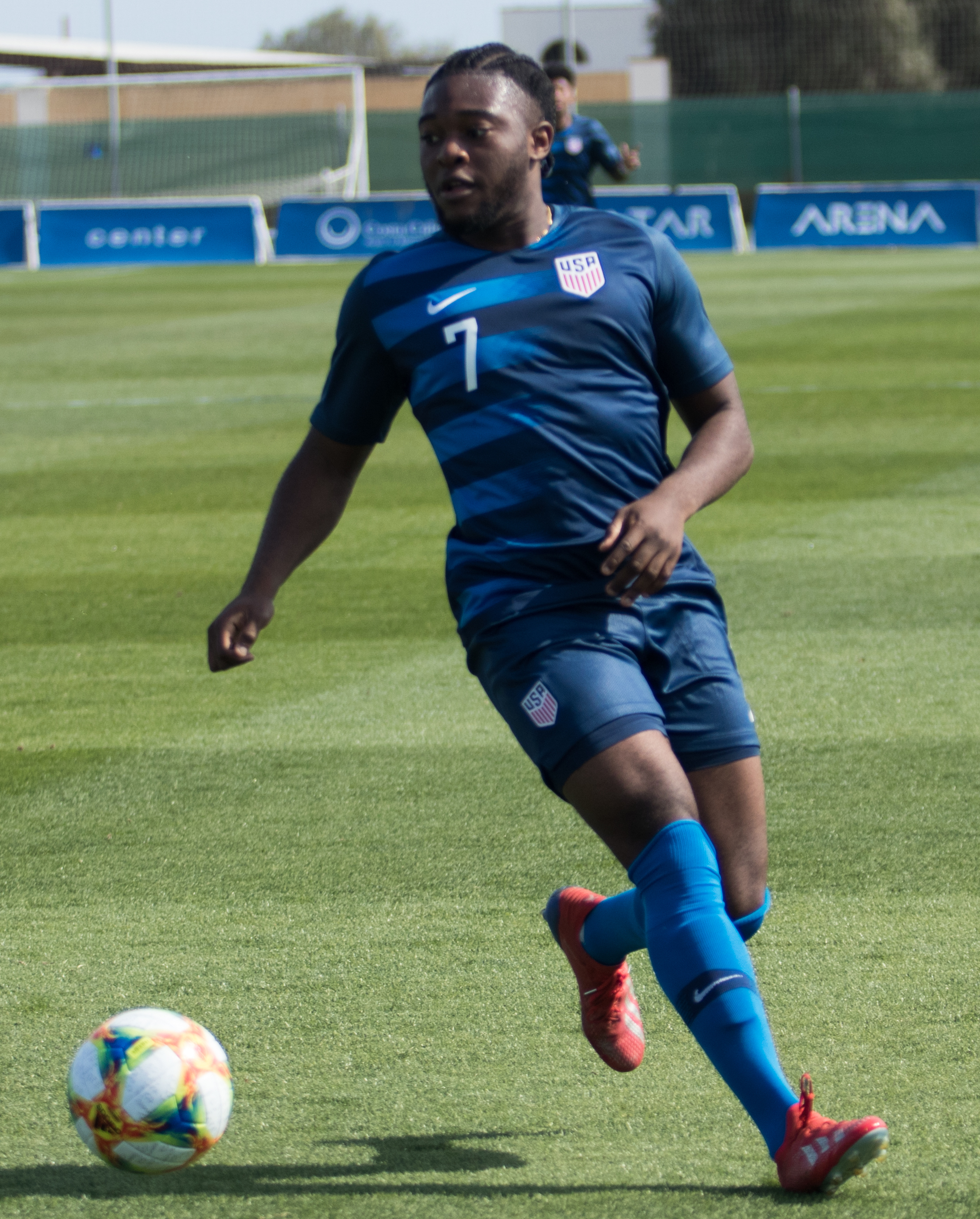
Akinola in action with the United States U20 in 2019.

In April 2015, Akinola made his international debut for the United States U15 national soccer team, appearing in a 4–1 victory against Costa Rica. The following day he scored his first international goal, netting four in a 6–2 win against Croatia. He also scored in his final appearances for the U15s in a 3–3 draw in England.

In December 2015, Akinola was called up to the United States U17 squad and played 40 minutes in a 3–2 defeat to England U16s. He scored his first goal against Brazil in March 2016, before scoring a brace against Russia a few days later. In October 2017, Akinola scored the only goal in a 1–0 victory over Ghana at the FIFA U17 World Cup in India.

He was called up to the U.S. senior team for their friendly match on December 9, 2020, against El Salvador. He scored a goal in his debut for the Americans against El Salvador, taking a knee and raising a fist in the air following his goal in a show of support for the racial equality movement.

=== Canada ===
Akinola accepted an invitation to a Canada training camp held in January 2021, but was forced to withdraw for health reasons. He then accepted an invitation to join the Canadian team for training prior to their World Cup qualifying matches on May 29, 2021. He was named to Canada's 60-man preliminary squad for the 2021 CONCACAF Gold Cup on June 18, 2021. The Canadian Soccer Association confirmed on June 30 that he had filed his one-time switch to represent Canada internationally, and was named to the final 23-man squad for the Gold Cup on July 1, Akinola made his first appearance for Canada at the tournament in their second group game against Haiti on July 15. In his second match for Canada, on July 18, 2021, Akinola faced his former country, the United States in the final round of the group stage. Akinola ruptured his ACL in the 24th minute of that match, effectively ruling him out of not only the remainder of the tournament, but also the rest of the club season with Toronto FC.

== Personal life ==
Ayo's younger brother Tom is also a soccer player and was a member of the TFC Academy and has attended a Canadian under-14 camp.

== Career statistics ==
=== Club ===
As of match played April 10, 2026

Appearances and goals by club, season and competition
Club	Season	League			Playoffs		National cup		Continental		Other		Total	
Club	Season	Division	Apps	Goals	Apps	Goals	Apps	Goals	Apps	Goals	Apps	Goals	Apps	Goals
Toronto FC II	2016	United Soccer League	10	2	—		—		—		—		10	2
Toronto FC	2018	Major League Soccer	4	0	—		2	1	—		—		6	1
Toronto FC	2019	Major League Soccer	8	1	—		1	0	2 (Note: Appearances in CONCACAF Champions League)	0	—		11	1
Toronto FC	2020	Major League Soccer	15 (Note: Includes three appearances and five goals in MLS is Back Tournament group stage)	9	1	0	—		—		—		16	9
Toronto FC	2021	Major League Soccer	11	3	—		—		2	0	—		13	3
Toronto FC	2022	Major League Soccer	26	2	—		4 (Note: Includes appearance in 2020 Canadian Championship final (played in 2022))	2	—		—		30	4
Toronto FC	2023	Major League Soccer	14	0	—		1	0	—		—		15	0
Toronto FC	2024	Major League Soccer	5	0	0	0	0	0	—		0	0	5	0
Toronto FC	Total		83	15	1	0	8	3	4	0	0	0	96	18
Toronto FC II (loan)	2018	United Soccer League	16	5	—		—		—		—		16	5
Toronto FC II (loan)	2019	USL League One	8	1	—		—		—		—		8	1
Toronto FC II (loan)	2023	MLS Next Pro	1	0	—		—		—		—		1	0
Toronto FC II (loan)	Total		25	6	—		—		—		—		25	6
San Jose Earthquakes (loan)	2023	Major League Soccer	7	0	0	0	—		—		1 (Note: Appearance in Leagues Cup)	0	8	0
Wil	2024–25	Swiss Challenge League	31	10	—		2	0	—		—		33	10
Vaduz	2025–26	Swiss Challenge League	18	4	—		2	0	—		—		20	4
Career total			171	35	1	0	11	3	4	0	1	0	188	38

=== International ===
As of match played March 28, 2022

Appearances and goals by national team and year
National team	Year	Apps	Goals
United States	2020	1	1
United States	Total	1	1
Canada	2021	2	0
Canada	2022	1	0
Canada	2023	1	0
Canada	Total	4	0
Career total		5	0

As of match played December 9, 2020. Akinola's team's score listed first, score column indicates score after each Akinola goal.

International goals by date, venue, team, opponent, score, result and competition
No.	Date	Venue	Team	Opponent	Score	Result	Competition
1	December 9, 2020	Inter Miami CF Stadium, Fort Lauderdale, United States	United States	El Salvador	5–0	6–0	Friendly

== Honours ==
Toronto FC

- Canadian Championship: 2020

United States U20

- CONCACAF U-20 Championship: 2018

Individual

- CONCACAF Under-20 Championship Best XI: 2018
