= Ifunanyachi Achara =

Nigerian footballer (born 1997)

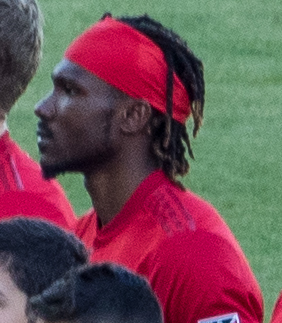
- Achara with Toronto FC in 2020

Personal information
- Date of birth: 28 September 1997 (age 29)
- Place of birth: Enugu, Nigeria
- Height: 1.78 m (5 ft 10 in)
- Position: Forward

Team information
- Current team: Bray Wanderers

Youth career
- 2015: Chicago Magic SC

College career
Years	Team	Apps	(Gls)
2016–2019	Georgetown Hoyas	55	(21)

Senior career*
Years	Team	Apps	(Gls)
2016	GPS Portland Phoenix	8	(6)
2018–2019	Black Rock FC	19	(11)
2020–2022	Toronto FC	30	(3)
2023	Houston Dynamo	0	(0)
2024	Houston Dynamo 2	14	(0)
2024	→ Ventura County FC (loan)	7	(2)
2025	Black Rock FC	2	(0)
2026–	Bray Wanderers	24	(8)
- * Club domestic league appearances and goals as of 16:40, 13 August 2026 (UTC)

Ifunanyachi Achara // (born 28 September 1997) is a Nigerian professional footballer who plays as a forward for League of Ireland First Division club Bray Wanderers.

== Early life ==
Achara was born in Enugu, Nigeria and grew up in the south east of Nigeria, where he lived until 2014 at the age of 17. He was noticed by former Nigerian national team player Jay-Jay Okocha who recommended him for the Nigerian U17 national team. He ultimately failed to make the roster for the team which won the 2015 FIFA U-17 World Cup.

Afterwards, he moved to the United States, where he played youth soccer with Chicago Magic SC and won 2015 U-17 US National Youth Championship. He attended Berkshire School in Sheffield, Massachusetts, where he was named to the High School All-America game Best XI, in his senior year. At Berkshire, he was on the soccer and track teams with his future Black Rock FC and Toronto FC teammate Jacob Shaffelburg.

== College career ==
After high school, Achara attended Georgetown University and played four seasons with the Hoyas in the Big East Conference of the NCAA. He was plagued by injuries throughout his four seasons causing him to miss several games each season. In his junior season, Achara was a First Team All-Big East honoree and a Second Team All-East Region selection. In 2019, he was named a team captain in his senior season, helping them win the 2019 NCAA title, which was the school's first national championship in its program history, and was named to the All-Big East Second Team. Over his four-year career with the Hoyas, he scored 21 goals and seven assists in 55 games.

== Club career ==
=== Semi-professional ===
Achara appeared for USL PDL side GPS Portland Phoenix in 2016 where he scored six goals in eight matches and helped lead them to win the PDL Northeast Division.

While at Georgetown, Achara played with Black Rock FC in USL League Two in 2018 and 2019 where he served as the team captain for both seasons. He finished as the joint leading scorer for the team in 2018 with eight goals, tied with Jacob Shaffelburg, as the team won the PDL Northeast Division title. He was named to the PDL Eastern All-Star team in 2018. While at Black Rock, he was ranked as the #13 Top Prospect in USL League Two.

=== Toronto FC ===
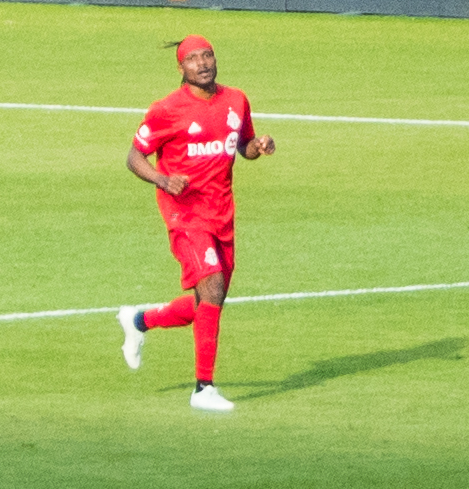
Achara playing for Toronto FC in 2020

Achara was selected 25th overall in the 2020 MLS SuperDraft by Toronto FC. After an impressive showing in pre-season, he was signed to the first team on 21 February 2020.

Achara made his debut on 7 March 2020, during Toronto FC's season home opener. Achara supplied a man of the match performance. He appeared to score the opening goal in the 11th minute, however the goal would be ruled off-side in a VAR decision. Achara went on to score the only goal of the game in the 81st minute as Toronto beat New York City FC 1–0. During the training camp for the MLS is Back Tournament, following the league stoppage due to the COVID-19 pandemic, Achara tore his ACL, after getting tangled up with teammate Omar Gonzalez during a drill, ending his rookie season after only playing one game. After his extended injury absence, he returned to the lineup on August 4, 2021 as a substitute against the Philadelphia Union, 17 months after his last appearance. Achara scored his first goal of the 2021 MLS season and the first since recovering from his ACL injury against CF Montreal August 27, 2021. On December 1, Toronto announced they had picked up Achara's contract option, keeping him with the club for the 2022 MLS season. After the end of the 2022 season, he departed the club, after the club declined his option for 2023.

=== Houston Dynamo ===
In the 2022 MLS Re-Entry Draft, he was selected in the second stage by the Houston Dynamo. On 7 December 2022, Achara signed with the Dynamo for their 2023 season, with a club option to extend his stay for 2024.

After missing the entire 2023 season due to injury, he signed a one-year contract with the second team, Houston Dynamo 2 in MLS Next Pro, for the 2024 season. In August 2024, he was loaned to fellow MLSNP side Ventura County FC for the remainder of the season. He scored his first goal for Ventura County on August 19 against the Tacoma Defiance.

=== Black Rock FC ===
In May 2025, Achara returned to his former club Black Rock FC in USL League Two, being named team captain. He made 2 appearances during the season.

=== Bray Wanderers ===
On 5 February 2026, Achara signed for Bray Wanderers in Ireland's second tier, the League of Ireland First Division. On 24 April, Achara scored his first goal for the club, scoring a rebound in a 1–1 draw with Cork City at the Carlisle Grounds. Two games later, Achara scored a consolation goal in a 2–1 loss away to Finn Harps On 30 June, Bray faced St Patrick's Athletic in the final of the Leinster Senior Cup, Achara was substituted on in the second half to help Bray to a 2–1 victory and first ever Leinster Senior Cup title. On 10 July, Achara scored a hat-trick in a 6–0 win at home to UCD. Two weeks later, Achara scored a late winner for Bray in a 2–1 victory away to Cobh Ramblers securing Wanderers first victory in Cobh in over 4 years.

== Personal life ==
His family still lives in Enugu, Nigeria, while his younger brother, Ugo Achara Jr., has a soccer scholarship to Northwestern University in Chicago, where he is part of the soccer program. In June 2020, following the murder of George Floyd during the COVID-19 pandemic by four member of the Minneapolis Police Department, he spoke out against racism, which he was not aware of until he went to the United States, noting that the way one is treated there boils down to skin colour, and it's sad that this is still an issue in society. In October 2020, he started a campaign to raise money for the End SARS campaign to disband the Nigerian Special Anti-Robbery Squad that has a long history of committing abuses.

== Career statistics ==
As of match played 30 September 2022

Club	Season	League			Playoffs		National Cup		Continental		Total	
Club	Season	Division	Apps	Goals	Apps	Goals	Apps	Goals	Apps	Goals	Apps	Goals
GPS Portland Phoenix	2016	PDL	8	6	0	0	?	0	—		8	6
GPS Portland Phoenix	Total		8	6	0	0	?	0	—		8	6
Black Rock FC	2018	PDL	9	8	1	0	—		—		10	8
Black Rock FC	2019	USL League Two	10	3	—		1	0	—		11	3
Black Rock FC	Total		19	11	1	0	1	0	—		21	11
Toronto FC	2020	MLS	1	1	0	0	—		—		1	1
Toronto FC	2021	MLS	14	2	—		3	1	0	0	17	3
Toronto FC	2022	MLS	15	0	—		1	0	—		16	0
Toronto FC	Total		30	3	0	0	4	1	0	0	34	4
Career total			56	20	1	0	5	1	0	0	62	21

== Honours ==
=== Club ===
GPS Portland Phoenix

- PDL Northeast Division winners: 2016

Black Rock FC

- PDL Northeast Division winners: 2018

Toronto FC

- Canadian Championship: 2020

Houston Dynamo FC

- Open cup champion: 2023

Bray Wanderers

- Leinster Senior Cup: 2025-26
