= Deandre Kerr =

Canadian soccer player (born 2002)

Personal information
- Full name: Deandre Christopher Kerr
- Date of birth: November 29, 2002 (age 23)
- Place of birth: Ajax, Ontario, Canada
- Height: 5 ft 11 in (1.80 m)
- Position: Forward

Team information
- Current team: AVS
- Number: 29

Youth career
- Ajax SC
- United FA
- 2017–2018: Whitby SC
- 2018–2020: Toronto FC

College career
Years	Team	Apps	(Gls)
2020–2021	Syracuse Orange	27	(13)

Senior career*
Years	Team	Apps	(Gls)
2018	Darby FC	0	(0)
2022–2026	Toronto FC	105	(15)
2026–	AVS	0	(0)

International career^{‡}
2017	Canada U15	3	(0)
2019	Canada U17	3	(0)
- * Club domestic league appearances and goals as of September 4, 2026 ‡ National team caps and goals as of 04:18, 19 December 2023 (UTC)

Deandre Christopher Kerr (born November 29, 2002) is a Canadian soccer player who plays as a forward for Liga Portugal 2 club AVS.

== Early life ==
Kerr began playing youth soccer with Ajax SC at age seven. Afterwards, he played for Pickering FC's United FA OPDL team. He then moved to Whitby SC and in 2018 went on trial with Scottish Premier League clubs. In November 2018, he joined the Toronto FC Academy.

== College career ==
In 2020, he began attending Syracuse University, playing for the men's soccer team. In his freshman season, he led the team with four goals and was named to the ACC All-Freshman Team. In his sophomore season, he led the team in goals with nine and in points with 21, was named to the second team All-Region, a 2021 All-ACC First Team selection, and Syracuse team MVP.

== Club career ==
Kerr was on the roster for Whitby's League1 Ontario team Darby FC in 2018, but did not feature in any matches.

On January 21, 2022, Kerr signed a three-year Homegrown player contract with Toronto FC, with options for 2025 and 2026. In his unofficial debut in pre-season, he scored twice in a 5–4 loss to the LA Galaxy on January 29. He started in the Toronto FC season opener against FC Dallas on February 26. In 2023, he finished as the team's co-leading scorer, alongside Italian Designated Players Lorenzo Insigne and Federico Bernardeschi with five goals. On May 21, 2024, he scored four goals in an 8–1 victory over CS Saint-Laurent in the 2024 Canadian Championship.

=== AVS ===
On September 4, 2026, Kerr completed a permanent transfer to Portuguese club AVS, signing a contract until 2028 with an option to extend.

== International career ==
Born in Canada, Kerr is of Jamaican descent. He played three matched for Canada U15 at the 2017 CONCACAF Boys' Under-15 Championship.

He started all three matches for Canada U17 at the 2019 FIFA U-17 World Cup.

In May 2023, Kerr was listed on the Canada preliminary rosters for the 2023 CONCACAF Nations League Finals.

== Career statistics ==
As of match played July 31, 2026

Appearances and goals by club, season and competition
Club	Season	League			Playoffs (Note: Includes MLS Cup playoffs)		National cup (Note: Includes Canadian Championship)		Continental (Note: Includes CONCACAF Champions League)		Other (Note: Includes Leagues Cup)		Total	
Club	Season	Division	Apps	Goals	Apps	Goals	Apps	Goals	Apps	Goals	Apps	Goals	Apps	Goals
Toronto FC	2022	Major League Soccer	26	3	—		2 (Note: Includes appearance in 2020 Canadian Championship final (played in 2022))	0	—		—		28	3
Toronto FC	2023	Major League Soccer	23	5	—		1	0	—		2	0	26	5
Toronto FC	2024	Major League Soccer	26	3	—		4	5	—		0	0	30	8
Toronto FC	2025	Major League Soccer	20	4	—		0	0	—		—		20	4
Toronto FC	2026	Major League Soccer	10	0	—		1	1	—		—		11	1
Career total			105	15	0	0	8	6	0	0	2	0	115	21

== Honours ==
Toronto FC

- Canadian Championship: 2020
