= Quentin Westberg =

French-American soccer player (born 1986)

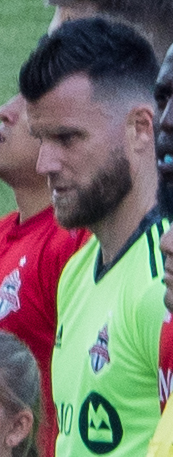
- Westberg with Toronto FC in 2020

Personal information
- Full name: Quentin Oyamo Westberg
- Date of birth: April 25, 1986 (age 40)
- Place of birth: Suresnes, France
- Height: 1.85 m (6 ft 1 in)
- Position: Goalkeeper

Youth career
- 1994–1996: Saint-Cloud
- 1996–1998: Paris Saint-Germain
- 1998–1999: Issy-les-Moulineaux
- 1999–2002: INF Clairefontaine
- 2002–2006: Troyes

Senior career*
Years	Team	Apps	(Gls)
2006–2010	Troyes	37	(0)
2010–2012	Évian	8	(0)
2012–2014	US Luzenac	71	(0)
2015	Sarpsborg 08	8	(0)
2015–2017	Tours	17	(0)
2016–2017	Tours B	5	(0)
2017–2019	Auxerre	16	(0)
2017	Auxerre B	4	(0)
2019–2022	Toronto FC	68	(0)
2023–2024	Atlanta United	6	(0)
Total		240	(0)

International career
2002–2003	United States U17		
2005–2006	United States U20	16	(0)
2008	United States U23		
- * Club domestic league appearances and goals

Quentin Oyamo Westberg (born April 25, 1986) is a former professional soccer player who played as a goalkeeper. Born in France, Westberg opted to represent the United States on the international level and is a former youth international having represented the team at under-17 and under-20 level, whom he played with at the 2005 FIFA World Youth Championship.

He is a graduate of the Clairefontaine academy and previously served as the number one goalkeeper for Troyes.

== Club career ==
=== Early career ===
Westberg was born in Suresnes, a commune in the western suburbs of Paris, to an American father and a French mother. Westberg initially started his football career with FC Saint-Cloud located not far from his hometown. He later had a stint at first division club Paris Saint-Germain training at the Camp des Loges before moving on to FC Issy-les-Moulineaux in southwest Paris. After a year at the club, Westberg was selected to attend the prestigious Clairefontaine academy after successfully passing the entrance exams required to attend. While attending the academy, he was a part of “A la Clairefontaine”, a documentary series by Bruno Sevaistre which chronicled the lives of the France's top young footballers during their time at the academy. After leaving the academy, Westberg signed youth papers with then-Ligue 1 club Troyes AC.

=== Troyes ===
Westberg spent approximately four years in the club's youth academy before being promoted to the senior team for the 2006–07 season. On October 21, 2006, he made his professional debut in a league match against Valenciennes appearing as a substitute in the fifty-first minute for the injured Ronan Le Crom with the match drawn at 1–1. Westberg conceded two goals resulting in Troyes losing the match. The following week, Westberg started against Saint-Étienne and earned his first career victory conceding only one goal in a 3–1 win. That would be his only two appearances of the season with Troyes suffering relegation to Ligue 2.

Due to his limited opportunities, in the off-season, Westberg pondered departing the club either through a loan deal or a definitive transfer. However, he committed to the club, who were now playing in Ligue 2. The new season saw Westberg handed the number 1 shirt and designated as the team's goalkeeper for cup matches. He earned his first career clean sheet in a 2–0 victory over Gueugnon in the Coupe de la Ligue on August 28, 2007. The following month, Troyes were eliminated from the competition after losing 1–0 to Nice with Westberg playing the full 90 minutes. In the Coupe de France, Troyes, with Westberg in goal, earned victories over amateur clubs Forbach (1–0) and Jarville (3–1) in the 7th and 8th round, respectively. In the following round against Montpellier, Westberg was replaced by domestic starter Cyrille Merville. Despite the shift, Troyes lost the match 1–0. Westberg's only appearance domestically came on the final match day of the season in an embarrassing 5–0 loss to Guingamp.

Westberg remained Troyes' domestic cup keeper for the 2008–09 season as he remained second fiddle to Merville in league play. Westberg performed well in the Coupe de France recording one clean sheet and helping Troyes reach the Round of 32 where the club was upended by Rodez. In the Coupe de la Ligue, the team, with Westberg in goal, reached the third round before losing to Metz. The club's positive performances in the cup competitions were overwhelming compared to its negative performance domestically as the club suffered relegation to the Championnat National, the third division of French football. With the club now semi-professional, a host of veterans departed the club, which included Merville, who joined Arles-Avignon. Due to Merville's departure, Westberg was finally handed the starting goalkeeper spot. In the 2009–10 season, Westberg performed well appearing in 32 of the 38 league matches contested conceding only 25 goals, which was second best among the league's starting goalkeepers. Following the season, in which Troyes earned promotion back to Ligue 2, Westberg was not re-signed to a new deal and departed the club after playing through the duration of his contract.

=== Évian ===
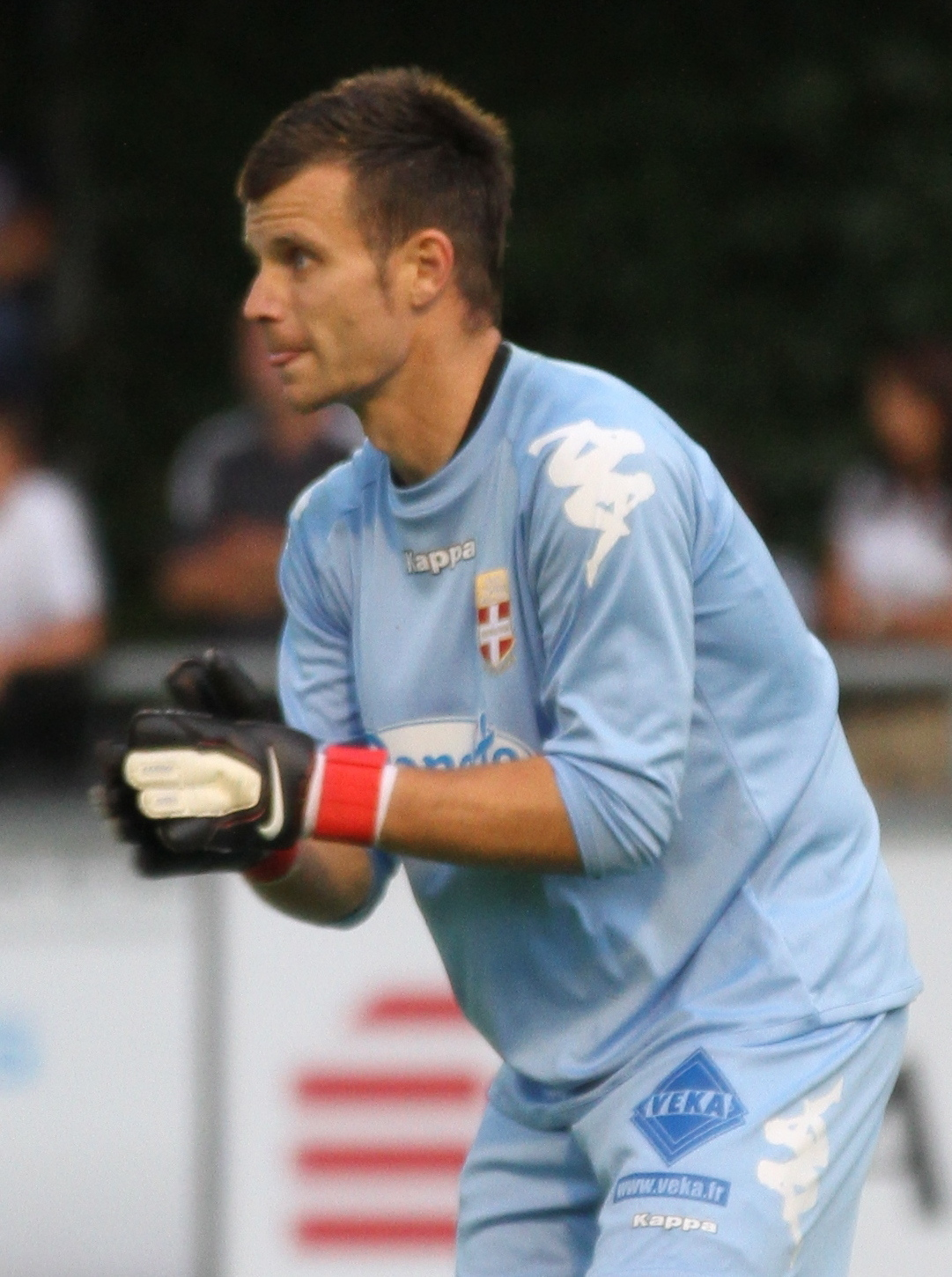
Quentin Westberg with Évian in 2011

On September 23, 2010, Ligue 2 club Évian Thonon Gaillard confirmed on its website that the club had signed Westberg. Prior to signing with the club, Westberg had been training with the reserve team of his former club Troyes in order to maintain his fitness. He made his debut four days later in a league match against Boulogne. On January 9, 2011, Westberg started in goal in Évian's 3–1 upset victory over the defending league champions Marseille in the Coupe de France.

On 20 May, he was in goal during a 1–2 away victory at Stade de Reims which saw his team gaining promotion to Ligue 1.

=== Sarpsborg 08 ===
On March 29, 2015, Tippeligaen club Sarpsborg 08 confirmed the contract.

=== Tours FC ===
On July 22, 2015, Westberg signed with Ligue 2 side Tours FC.

=== Toronto FC ===
After two and a half years with AJ Auxerre, he moved to Toronto FC in February 2019. Initially signed to be the backup goalkeeper to Alex Bono, he quickly won the starting role, earning a two-year contract extension with an option for a third, in January 2020. In December 2021 Toronto picked up Westerberg's contract option, keeping him through 2022. After the end of the 2022 season, he departed the club, upon the expiry of his contract.

=== Atlanta United ===
On December 23, 2022, it was announced that Westberg would join MLS side Atlanta United for their 2023 season. He later re-signed with the club for the 2024 season.

On November 26, 2024, Atlanta United announced that Westberg had retired.

== International career ==
Though born in France, Westberg opted to represent the United States. Westberg's father, an American, reached out to the United States Soccer Federation, which led to the federation sending scouts John Hackworth and Peter Mellor of the United States under-17 team to watch him. Westberg made his first major tournament appearance with the under-17 team at the 2003 FIFA U-17 World Championship, held in Finland, where he served as backup keeper to Phil Marfuggi. The United States reached the quarter-finals, where they lost 0–3 to Brazil. Westberg's only appearance in the competition was in an 0–2 defeat to Spain, in which he allowed goals from Cesc Fàbregas and Jurado.

== Honors ==
Toronto FC

- Canadian Championship: 2020
