= Bill Manning =

American sports executive

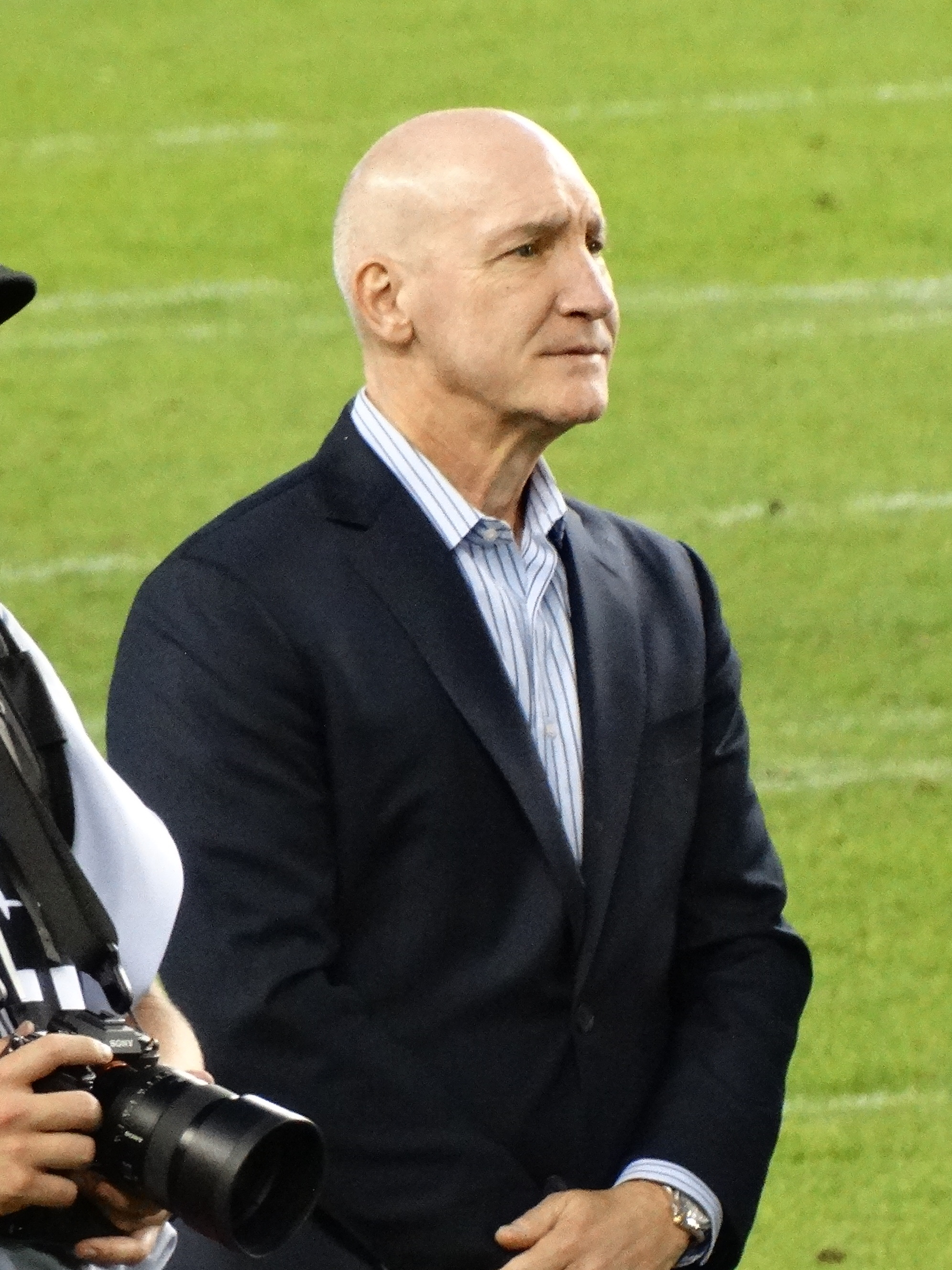
- Manning in 2024
- Born: June 23, 1965 (age 61); Massapequa, New York, U.S.
- Education: University of Bridgeport (BS, MBA)
- Spouse: Jennifer Manning
- Children: 2
Association football career
- Position: Defender
Youth career
- 1972–1983: Massapequa SC
- 1979–1983: Long Island JSL Select Team
College career
Years	Team	Apps	(Gls)
1983–1986	Bridgeport Purple Knights		
Senior career*
Years	Team	Apps	(Gls)
?–1991	Brooklyn Italians		
1991	Penn-Jersey Spirit	3	(0)
1993	Valley Golden Eagles		
1994–1995	New York Fever		
International career
1992	Puerto Rico	2	(0)
- * Club domestic league appearances and goals

Bill Manning (born June 23, 1965) is a sports executive. He has worked in the front office of the Houston Rockets of the NBA and the Philadelphia Eagles of the NFL, Toronto FC, Real Salt Lake, and the Tampa Bay Mutiny in Major League Soccer and the Toronto Argonauts of the Canadian Football League. He previously was a professional soccer player. Born in the United States, he represented the Puerto Rico national team.

== Early life and education ==
Manning is a native of Massapequa, New York. As a child, he played soccer for Massapequa Soccer Club as well as the Long Island Junior Soccer League (LIJSL) Select Team.

After high school, he was recruited by Adelphi, Hofstra, Harwick, North Carolina, but ultimately decided to attend the University of Bridgeport in Connecticut, who offered him a full-ride scholarship. He earned a Bachelor of Science Degree as well as a Masters in Business Administration. While at Bridgeport, he was a member of the Bridgeport Purple Knights men's soccer team and helped lead the team to the 1986 NCAA Division II Final Four. He was named to the school's Hall of Fame in 2006 and received the Distinguished Alumni Award in 2016. He was selected to play in the 1986 Intercollegiate Soccer Association of America East-West All-Star Game.

== Professional career ==
After college, he became a professional soccer player joining the Brooklyn Italians with whom he advanced to the final of the U.S. Open Cup twice, winning the title in 1991 U.S. Open Cup, where he received a red card in the finals in the 23rd minute. He then joined the Penn-Jersey Spirit in 1991 of the American Professional Soccer League, a precursor to the United Soccer League. In 1993, he joined the Valley Golden Eagles. In 1994 and 1995, he played for the New York Fever.

He played with the Puerto Rico national team during the 1994 FIFA World Cup qualifying tournament.

== Management career ==
In 1993, Manning began his career in sports management, joining the Continental Indoor Soccer League in a front office role for their inaugural season. The following year, he joined the New York Fever where he served as the Director of Marketing and Operations in addition to being a player. In 1996, he was hired as vice president and General Manager of the Long Island Rough Riders of the United Soccer League, where he and the club received the Marketing Excellent Award twice for best overall marketing in the USL.

After the 1997 USL season, he joined the Minnesota Thunder as president and General Manager, where they advanced to the 1998 USL A-League championship match. In 1999, Minnesota won the league championship and Manning was named USL Executive of the Year, in part due to the championship and developing the second-highest revenue base in the league.

In 2000, he joined Major League Soccer club Tampa Bay Mutiny as president and General Manager. He was named 2000 MLS Executive of the Year. He remained with the team until the team was contracted prior to the 2002 MLS season.

After his contract with MLS expired in 2003, he moved to the National Basketball Association, joining the Houston Rockets as Director of Corporate Partnerships

In 2004, he moved to the National Football League with the Philadelphia Eagles serving as Vice President of Sales and Service, overseeing a 50% increase in corporate sponsorship from 2004 to 2007.

In 2008, he returned to soccer and MLS, being named the President of Real Salt Lake as well as the President of Rio Tinto Stadium. In 2009, RSL won the MLS Cup, which was the first major professional sports championship in Utah in 40 years, and finished as runner-ups in 2013. He was named MLS Executive of the Year in 2012, and won the award again in 2014 for the second time in three years, and his third time overall. He and the club parted in 2015.

In 2015, he was named as President of Toronto FC, winning the MLS cup in 2017, and finishing as runner-ups in 2016 and 2019. In 2018, after the Toronto Argonauts of the Canadian Football League were acquired by Maple Leafs Sports and Entertainment, the owners of Toronto FC, Manning was named President of the Argos, in addition to his role as president of TFC. In March 2021, he signed a five-year extension to remain president of both teams. In July 2024, he parted ways with Maple Leafs Sports and Entertainment, departing both roles by mutual agreement.

== Personal ==
Manning earned a U.S. Soccer National "A" Coaching License in 2001. He is married to Jennifer, with whom he has two sons, John and Will.
