= Alonso Coello =

Alonso Coello may refer to:

- Alonso Coello Camarero (born 1999), Spanish professional footballer
- Alonso Sánchez Coello (1531–1588), Iberian portrait painter of the Spanish and Portuguese Renaissance
