= Malik Henry (soccer) =

Canadian soccer player (born 2002)

- Henry with Toronto FC II in 2025

Personal information
- Date of birth: July 23, 2002 (age 24)
- Place of birth: Hamilton, Ontario, Canada
- Height: 5 ft 6 in (1.68 m)
- Position: Midfielder

Team information
- Current team: Toronto FC
- Number: 78

Youth career
- Saltfleet Stoney Creek SC
- Hamilton United
- Toronto FC

College career
Years	Team	Apps	(Gls)
2020	North Carolina Tar Heels	3	(0)
2021–2024	Akron Zips	71	(2)

Senior career*
Years	Team	Apps	(Gls)
2018	Toronto FC III	1	(0)
2022	Hamilton United	10	(1)
2023–2024	Flint City Bucks	18	(4)
2025	Toronto FC II	19	(0)
2025	→ Toronto FC (loan)	2	(0)
2025–	Toronto FC	23	(0)
2025–	→ Toronto FC II (loan)	1	(0)

International career^{‡}
2017	Canada U15	4	(1)
2026	Canada B	1	(0)
- * Club domestic league appearances and goals as of September 12, 2026 ‡ National team caps and goals as of January 17, 2026

Malik Henry (born July 23, 2002) is a Canadian soccer player who plays for Toronto FC in Major League Soccer.

== Early life ==
Henry began playing youth soccer at age four with Saltfleet Stoney Creek SC. He later played with Hamilton United, before spending three years with the Toronto FC Academy from U15 to U17 level.

== College career ==
In 2020, he began attending the University of North Carolina at Chapel Hill, where he played for the men's soccer team.

In 2021, he transferred to University of Akron to play for their men's soccer team. At the end of the season, he was named to the All-Mid-American Conference Second Team, All-Ohio Second Team, and was ranked #50 on the TopDrawerSoccer.com Men's National Freshmen Top-100 Postseason list. In 2022, he was named to the All-MAC First Team. In 2023, he was named to the All-Big East Conference Second Team and the 2023 All-East Region Third Team. After the 2023 season, he was draft in the 2023 MLS SuperDraft by CF Montréal, however, he chose to return to Akron for the 2024 year to finish his degree and complete his final season of eligibility. Ahead of the 2024 season, he was named to the Big East All-Preseason Team. On September 28, 2024, he scored his first career collegiate goal in a 1-0 victory over the Gerogetown Hoyas. At the end of the 2024 season, he was named to the All-Big East Second Team and the All-East Region First Team.

== Club career ==
In 2018, Henry played with Toronto FC III in League1 Ontario.

In 2022, he played with Hamilton United in League1 Ontario. He scored one goal for the club in a 5-1 victory over Scrosoppi FC.

In 2023, he played with the Flint City Bucks in USL League Two.

At the 2024 MLS SuperDraft, Henry was selected in the 2nd round (39th overall) by CF Montréal. He then returned to college for another season, before attending training camp with the club in 2025, but was told there was no roster space available to sign him.

In March 2025, he signed with Toronto FC II in MLS Next Pro. He made his debut on March 9 against FC Cincinnati 2. In June 2025, he signed a short-term loan with the Toronto FC first team. He made his Major League Soccer debut on June 25, 2025 against the New York Red Bulls. He later signed an additional short-term loans. In July 2025, Toronto FC acquired his MLS rights from CF Montréal, in exchange for $75,000 in conditional general allocation money and a 2026 MLS SuperDraft third-round pick, while also retaining a sell-on clause.

In August 2025, he signed a first team contract with Toronto FC for the remainder of 2025, with options for 2026 and 2027. He would later be loaned to the second team for some matches later in 2025.

== International career ==
He made his debut in the Canadian national program in February 2017, attending a camp with the Canada U15 team. In August, he was named to the roster for the 2017 CONCACAF Boys' Under-15 Championship.

In January 2026, he was named to the Canada senior team for the first time, joining the squad for a training camp and an international friendly against Guatemala as an injury replacement for Jacob Shaffelburg. He appeared in the match against Guatemala, in his first senior appearance, earning an assist in a 1-0 victory, however, as it was designated a B-level friendly, it did not count as an official senior cap.

== Career statistics ==
As of match played September 12, 2026

Appearances and goals by club, season and competition
Club	Season	League			Playoffs		National cup		Other		Total	
Club	Season	Division	Apps	Goals	Apps	Goals	Apps	Goals	Apps	Goals	Apps	Goals
Toronto FC III	2018	League1 Ontario	1	0	—		—		—		1	0
Hamilton United	2022	League1 Ontario	10	1	—		—		—		10	1
Flint City Bucks	2023	USL League Two	6	1	2	0	—		—		8	1
Flint City Bucks	2024	USL League Two	12	3	3	0	—		—		15	3
Flint City Bucks	Total		18	4	5	0	0	0	0	0	23	4
Toronto FC II	2025	MLS Next Pro	19	0	0	0	—		—		19	0
Toronto FC (loan)	2025	Major League Soccer	2	0	—		—		—		2	0
Toronto FC	2025	Major League Soccer	7	0	—		—		—		7	0
Toronto FC	2026	Major League Soccer	16	0	—		1	0	—		17	0
Toronto FC	Toronto FC total		25	0	0	0	1	0	0	0	26	0
Career total			73	5	5	0	1	0	0	0	79	5
