= Zane Monlouis =

English footballer (born 2003)

Personal information
- Date of birth: 16 October 2003 (age 23)
- Place of birth: Lewisham, England
- Height: 6 ft 1 in (1.85 m)
- Position: Defender

Team information
- Current team: Toronto FC
- Number: 12

Youth career
- 2012–2023: Arsenal

Senior career*
Years	Team	Apps	(Gls)
2023–2025	Arsenal	0	(0)
2024	→ Reading (loan)	1	(0)
2025–	Toronto FC	35	(0)

International career
2018	England U15	1	(0)
2019	England U17	4	(0)
- * Club domestic league appearances and goals as of 7 November 2026

Zane Monlouis (born 16 October 2003) is an English professional footballer who plays as a defender for Major League Soccer club Toronto FC.

== Club career ==
Born in Lewisham, London, Monlouis began his career with Arsenal in May 2012, turning professional in October 2020. He moved on loan to Reading in February 2024.

In February 2025, he signed a two-year contract (with options for a further two seasons) with Canadian Major League Soccer club Toronto FC. He made his debut for Toronto as a substitute in a 2–2 draw at D.C. United. On 25 July 2025, Monlouis was placed on the season-ending injury list as a result of an abductor and rectus injury picked up in a match against the New York Red Bulls.

== International career ==
Born in England, Monlouis is of Jamaican descent. He has been capped by England at under-15 and under-17 levels. In March 2024, he was called up to a training camp with the Jamaica U23s.

== Career statistics ==
As of match played 7 November 2026

Appearances and goals by club, season and competition
Club	Season	League			National cup		League cup		Other		Total	
Club	Season	Division	Apps	Goals	Apps	Goals	Apps	Goals	Apps	Goals	Apps	Goals
Arsenal U21	2020–21	—			—		—		1 (Note: Appearance(s) in EFL Trophy)	0	1	0
Arsenal U21	2021–22	—			—		—		2	0	2	0
Arsenal U21	2022–23	—			—		—		1	0	1	0
Arsenal U21	2023–24	—			—		—		4	0	4	0
Arsenal U21	Total		0	0	0	0	0	0	8	0	8	0
Arsenal	2023–24	Premier League	0	0	0	0	0	0	0	0	0	0
Arsenal	2024–25	Premier League	0	0	0	0	0	0	0	0	0	0
Arsenal	Total		0	0	0	0	0	0	0	0	0	0
Reading (loan)	2023–24	League One	1	0	0	0	0	0	0	0	1	0
Toronto FC	2025	Major League Soccer	10	0	0	0	—		—		10	0
Toronto FC	2026	Major League Soccer	25	0	1	0	—		—		26	0
Toronto FC	Total		35	0	1	0	0	0	0	0	36	0
Career total			36	0	1	0	0	0	0	0	37	0
