= Toronto FC =

Canadian professional soccer club based in Toronto

- Full name: Toronto Football Club
- Nickname: The Reds (French: Les Rouges)
- Short name: TFC
- Founded: October 27, 2005; 21 years ago
- Stadium: BMO Field; Toronto, Ontario
- Capacity: 28,351
- Owner: Maple Leaf Sports & Entertainment
- President: Vacant
- General Manager: Jason Hernandez
- Coach: Vacant
- League: Major League Soccer
- 2026: Eastern Conference: 12th Overall: 24th Playoffs: Did not qualify
- Website: www.torontofc.ca
| Home colours | Away colours |

Toronto Football Club is a Canadian professional soccer club based in Toronto. The club competes in Major League Soccer (MLS) as a member of the Eastern Conference. The team plays home matches at BMO Field at Exhibition Place and joined MLS in 2007 as the league's first Canadian franchise.

The first team is operated by Maple Leaf Sports & Entertainment (MLSE), which also operates the MLS Next Pro affiliate team Toronto FC II and other professional sports franchises in the city, including the Toronto Maple Leafs of the National Hockey League (NHL), Toronto Raptors of the National Basketball Association (NBA) and the Toronto Argonauts of the Canadian Football League (CFL).

In 2017, Toronto FC won a domestic treble with the MLS Cup, Supporters' Shield and Canadian Championship, making them the first and only MLS club to ever do so. They are eight-time winners of the Canadian Championship and were runners-up of the 2018 CONCACAF Champions League and the MLS Cup in 2016 and 2019.

By 2026, the club had an estimated value of US$725 million, making them the thirteenth-most valuable club in Major League Soccer.

== History ==
=== Expansion ===
MLS awarded Toronto a team in 2005. Maple Leaf Sports & Entertainment (MLSE) paid US$10 million for the franchise. The name of the team was announced on May 11, 2006.

The announcement followed an online consultation in which the public was invited to vote on the name for a limited period. The voting options were "Toronto Northmen", "Inter Toronto FC", "Toronto Reds", and "Toronto FC". MLSE's strategy in choosing "Toronto FC" following this process was based on two reasons. Firstly, over 40 percent of the online vote supported the simple Toronto FC name during the consultation; secondly, MLSE hoped that the fairly generic name would help the new club earn a more organic nickname from the Toronto fans rather than having one imposed upon the team. The team has been called "TFC" and "the Reds" by the media, the team, and the fans. The "FC" ("Football Club") in the club's name is the conventional initialism for association football teams across Europe and is commonly used among MLS teams to present a more authentic soccer brand. The Inter Toronto FC name would later be used for a different Toronto-based professional soccer club, albeit one that plays in the Canadian Premier League.

=== Formative years (2007–2010) ===
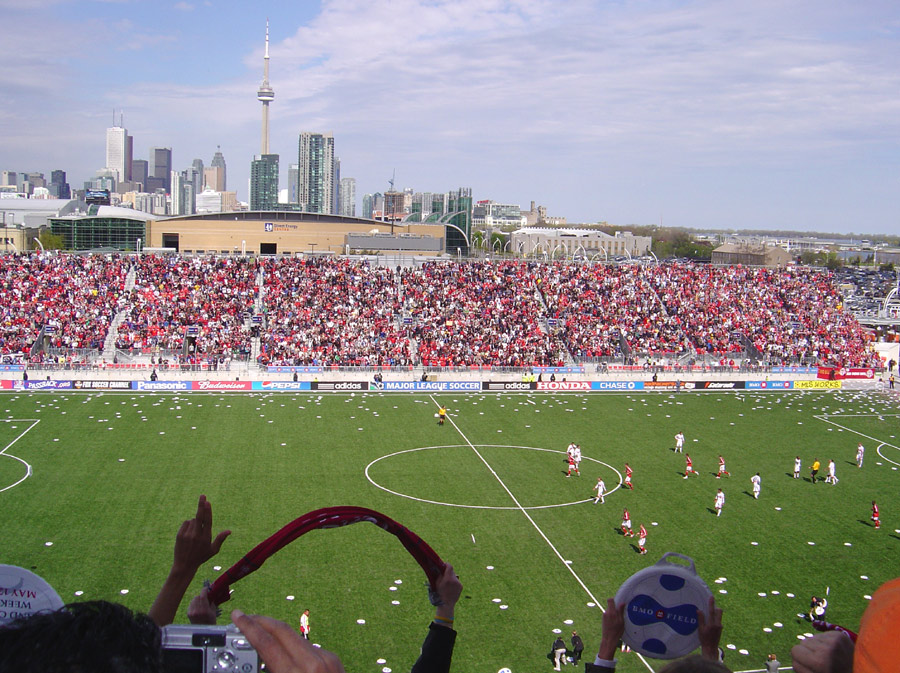
Fans celebrating the club's first goal in its history, scored by Danny Dichio at home on May 12, 2007

Despite a long scoreless streak to start the club's history, Toronto FC quickly began to establish itself as a club with significant fan support. The club's first win came on May 12, 2007, at BMO Field as Danny Dichio scored the team's first goal in the 24th minute of a 3–1 home win over the Chicago Fire. Though TFC slipped to the bottom of the MLS standings with a record of 6–17–7, the team built a foundation as the first Canadian team in MLS. In the club's second season in 2008, Toronto hosted the 2008 MLS All-Star Game. The club finished last in the Eastern Conference with a record of 9–13–8, but the enthusiastic fan base continued to fill BMO Field to capacity. To determine the Canadian Soccer Association's representative in the CONCACAF Champions League, Toronto FC played in the inaugural Canadian Championship in 2008 competing for the Voyageurs Cup. TFC were the favourites to win the championship in its first year, but the Montreal Impact prevailed.

The last-place New York Red Bulls defeated Toronto FC 5–0 in the final 2009 regular season game, leaving TFC one point out of the playoffs. Despite bringing in some high-profile talent, the Reds could not seem to field a consistent side. Dwayne De Rosario became an immediate scoring influence and Amado Guevara was a strong playmaker and established MLS veteran, but the Honduran's future at the Canadian team seemed murky with looming 2010 FIFA World Cup duties. Rookie goalkeeper Stefan Frei quickly replaced Greg Sutton as a regular starter and immediately became a fan favourite. TFC only scored two goals in the final 15 minutes of games all season (last in MLS). During the same 15-minute period, they gave up 16 goals (most in MLS), thus creating a −14 goal differential during the final 15 minutes.

In the 2009 Canadian Championship, Toronto FC required a four-goal victory over the Montreal Impact in the final game of the competition to nullify the Vancouver Whitecaps' +4 goal differential. Anything less would result in Vancouver winning the championship. Toronto FC went down 1–0 early but overwhelmed an under-strength Impact side 6–1 on the back of a hat-trick by De Rosario. Guevara added two, scoring in the 69th and 92nd minute. Chad Barrett scored the decisive goal in the 82nd minute, which gave TFC the lead over Vancouver. The unlikely victory was dubbed by fans and media as the "Miracle in Montreal". Toronto FC subsequently participated in the 2009–10 CONCACAF Champions League, but lost 1–0 on aggregate to the Puerto Rico Islanders in the preliminary round of the tournament.

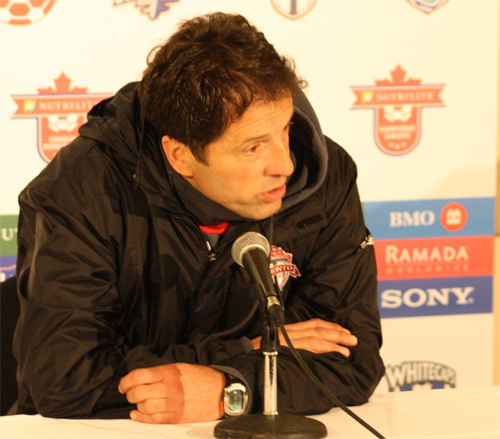
Preki at a press conference as the club's head coach; he coached the club from November 2009 to September 2010.

After failing to qualify on the final day of the 2009 campaign, Maple Leaf Sports & Entertainment said anything short of a playoff spot in 2010 would be unacceptable. With that directive, former director of soccer Mo Johnston hired Preki and made wholesale changes to the roster to reflect the U.S. Hall of Fame's plan to play a tough, defensive style. Despite scoring troubles, TFC played well at the start, going undefeated in seven games at one time. The team struggled following the World Cup break. Sensing problems in the locker room and to try to salvage the season, MLSE dismissed both Johnston and Preki on September 14, naming Earl Cochrane interim director of soccer and Nick Dasovic interim coach. The players responded to Dasovic's more open flexible style, but it was not enough as the club was eliminated from playoff contention with three games left in the season. Off-field issues with season-seat holders over the 2011 season ticket package added to the fans' frustrations, forcing MLSE to hold a series of town hall meetings.

Toronto FC played Honduran side C.D. Motagua in the preliminary round of the 2010–11 CONCACAF Champions League. TFC won 1–0 in the first leg on a goal by Chad Barrett, and tied 2–2 in the second leg on goals by De Rosario and Barrett, qualifying for the group stage. Toronto FC won their first group stage match 2–1 against Mexican side Cruz Azul on August 17, 2010. However, the team failed to qualify for the championship round after finishing in third place behind group winners Real Salt Lake and second place Cruz Azul.

=== Cup success and league failure (2011–2014) ===
On November 3, 2010, MLSE announced the hiring of former German international and coach Jürgen Klinsmann, and his California-based company, SoccerSolutions, to fix the team's game. Over the next six months, Klinsmann assessed the team, identifying a playing style, and recommended a candidate for the director of soccer position. On January 6, 2011, the new management team for Toronto FC was announced. Aron Winter was hired as head coach with his compatriot Bob de Klerk named first assistant coach. Paul Mariner was named as director of soccer. Winter was selected to bring the Ajax culture, possession and 4–3–3 system to Toronto FC. Management made wholesale changes to the roster before and during the 2011 season, trading numerous players and eventually their captain and Toronto native De Rosario.

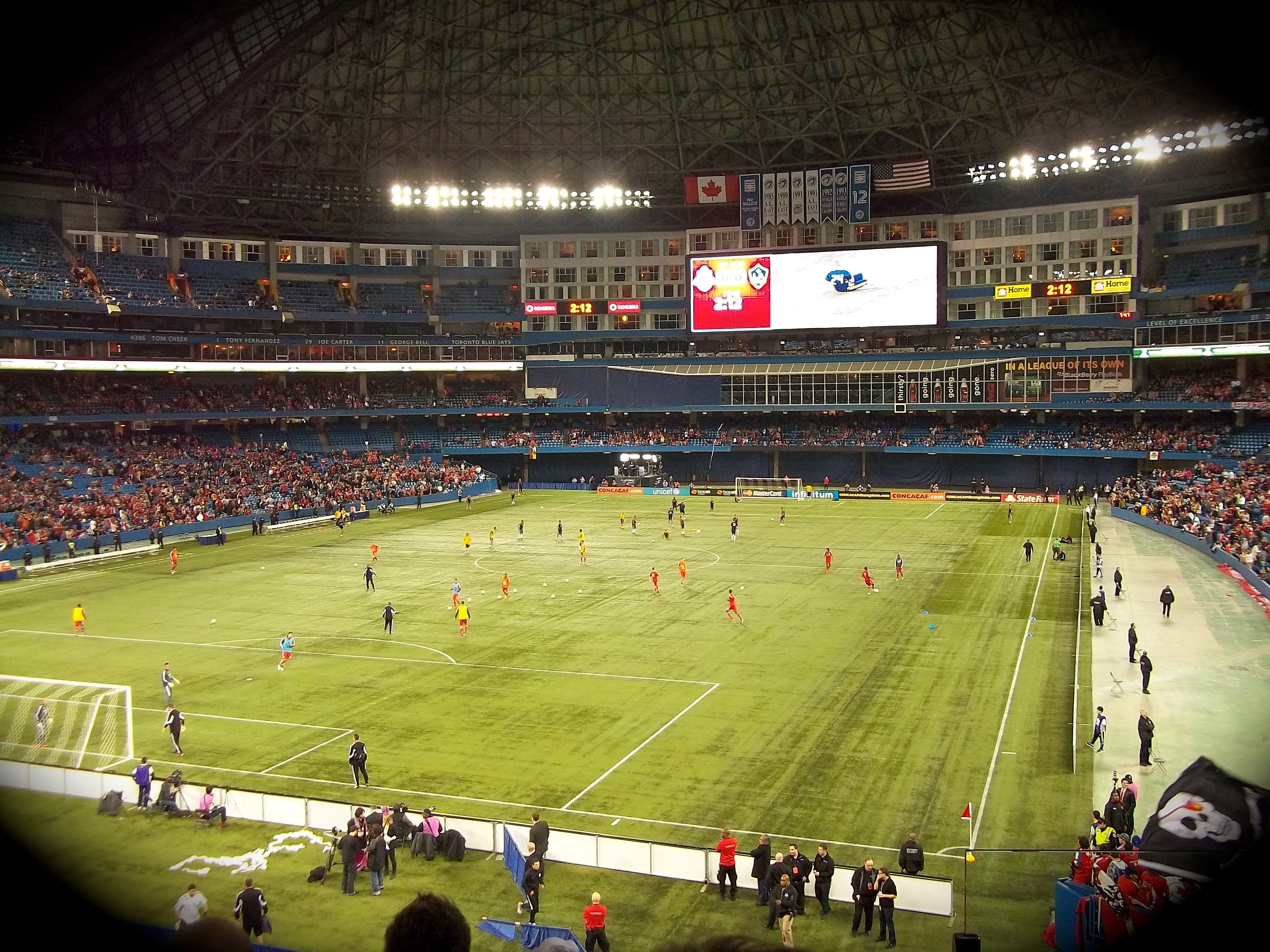
A game between Toronto FC and LA Galaxy at Rogers Centre during the 2011–12 CONCACAF Champions League quarter-finals. Toronto later advanced to that tournament's semi-finals.

Toronto FC used its remaining two designated player slots on two notable European players, signing Torsten Frings and Danny Koevermans to 2.5-year contracts. The team went on to set a record for most players used in a MLS season with 39. Despite a strong finish to the season with only two losses in their last 12 games, TFC missed the MLS playoffs for a fifth straight year. Nonetheless, they earned a win in their final group stage match of 2011–12 CONCACAF Champions League visiting the FC Dallas, securing a berth in the knockout stage versus LA Galaxy. After a 2–2 draw in Toronto before 47,658 fans at the Rogers Centre, Toronto FC defeated the Galaxy 2–1 in Los Angeles to reach the CONCACAF Champions League semi-finals, the first Canadian team to do so. They were defeated by Mexican side Santos Laguna in the semi-finals 7–3 on aggregate.

On June 7, 2012, Aron Winter resigned from the team upon refusing to be reassigned from his head coaching role after the team started the season with a nine-game losing streak, setting an MLS record for the worst start to a season. Under Winter in 2012, the team's league record was 1–9–0 and in all other competitions was 3–1–4, including a fourth-straight Canadian Championship. He was replaced by Paul Mariner, but TFC continued to struggle finishing with a 4–12–8 record in league play under him. Toronto FC also failed to advance in the CONCACAF Champions League, finishing second in its group with a 2–2–0 record. Overall, they finished the MLS season on a 14-game winless streak and ended up in last place, with five wins and 23 points.

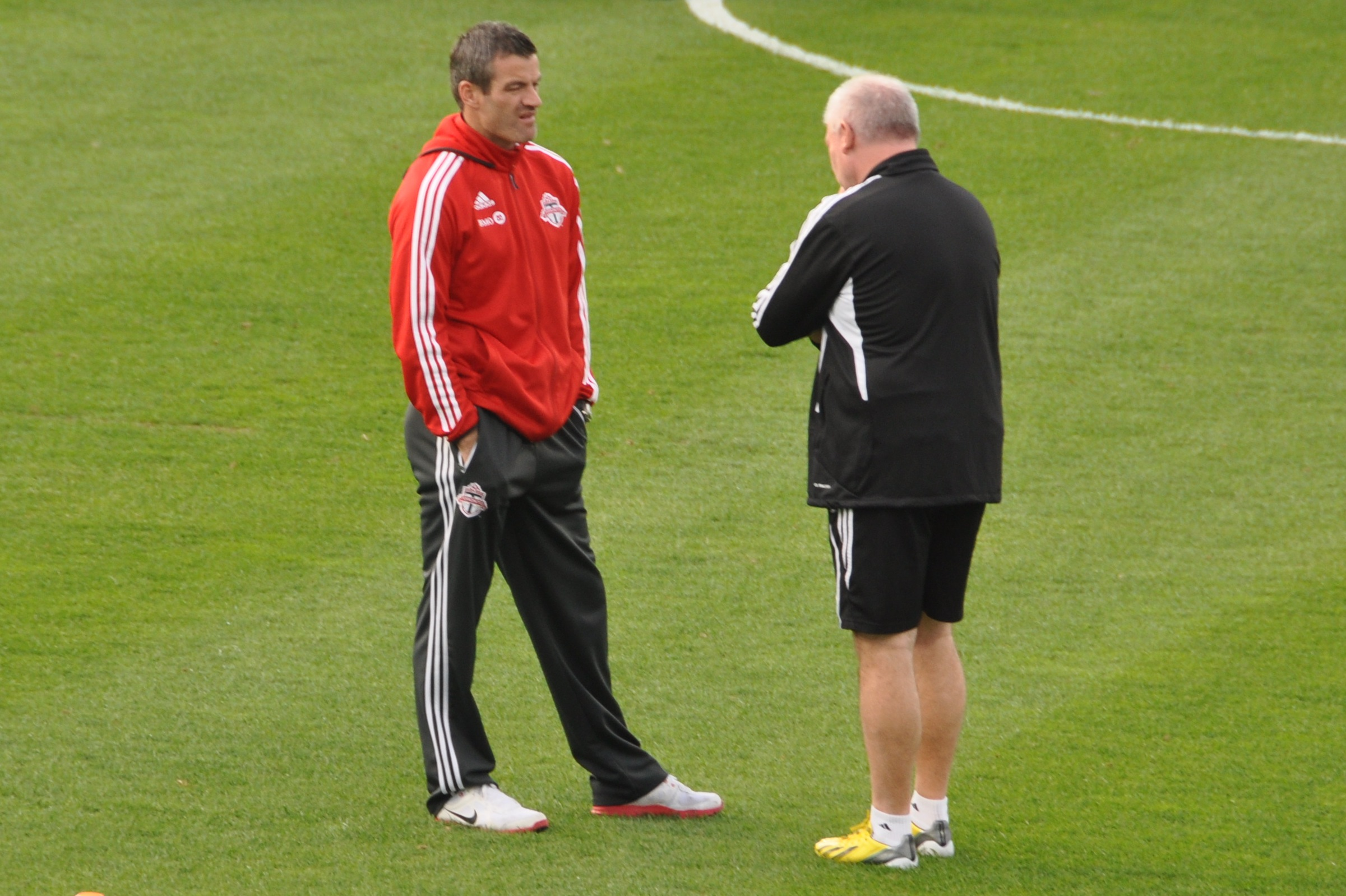
Ryan Nelsen as head coach of the Toronto FC. He served as head coach from January 2013 to August 2014.

It was announced Kevin Payne would be leaving D.C. United for the general manager position at Toronto FC on November 27, 2012. First-time coach Ryan Nelsen replaced Mariner as of January 7, 2013. On April 25, 2013, Payne signed the first young designated player in MLS, Matías Laba. On July 9, Payne controversially traded Luis Silva to D.C. United for an undisclosed amount of allocation money. The team fired Payne on September 4. Following the removal of Payne, recently appointed MLSE president Tim Leiweke reasoned that there were philosophical differences between them as to how Toronto FC should move forward. Leiweke, who brought David Beckham to the LA Galaxy in early 2007, quickly revealed that he intended to make TFC more competitive with similarly ambitious, blockbuster signings. On September 20, Toronto FC announced that the vacant general manager position had been filled by Tim Bezbatchenko.

Under Bezbatchenko, Toronto FC made several high-profile moves during the 2013–14 off season. Among the transfers were MLS veterans Justin Morrow and Jackson; Brasileiro star Gilberto, United States international Michael Bradley of AS Roma, and the return of Toronto FC leading goal scorer De Rosario. On January 10, 2014, Tottenham Hotspur announced they had agreed a deal with the team over the transfer of England international Jermain Defoe for a reported fee of £6 million, and an Advertising Rights Agreement with Maple Leaf Sports & Entertainment Ltd. Defoe would earn a reported £90,000 a week, making him the highest earner in MLS. These moves required the trade of Matias Laba to Vancouver to comply with MLS's maximum of three designated players per team. On February 7, 2014, Brazil national team keeper Júlio César joined on loan from Queens Park Rangers. The team started the year with promise, but much like 2010, they floundered after the World Cup break. On August 31, Nelsen was fired by Bezbatchenko a day after a 0–3 defeat to the New England Revolution at BMO field, where Nelsen criticized Bezbatchenko in his post-match press conference for putting the players under needless pressure in the media. The head coaching position was filled by former American international and Chivas USA assistant, Greg Vanney. Although the team won the most games in its history, it failed to reach the playoffs for the eighth consecutive year. After completing only 11 months of his four-year contract with TFC, Defoe joined Premier League club Sunderland on January 16, 2015. On the same day, Toronto received American Jozy Altidore from Sunderland to complete the other half of the player swap. Three days later, the team signed Italian international Sebastian Giovinco from Juventus on an annual salary of $7 million.

=== Contenders in the league and treble (2015–2017) ===
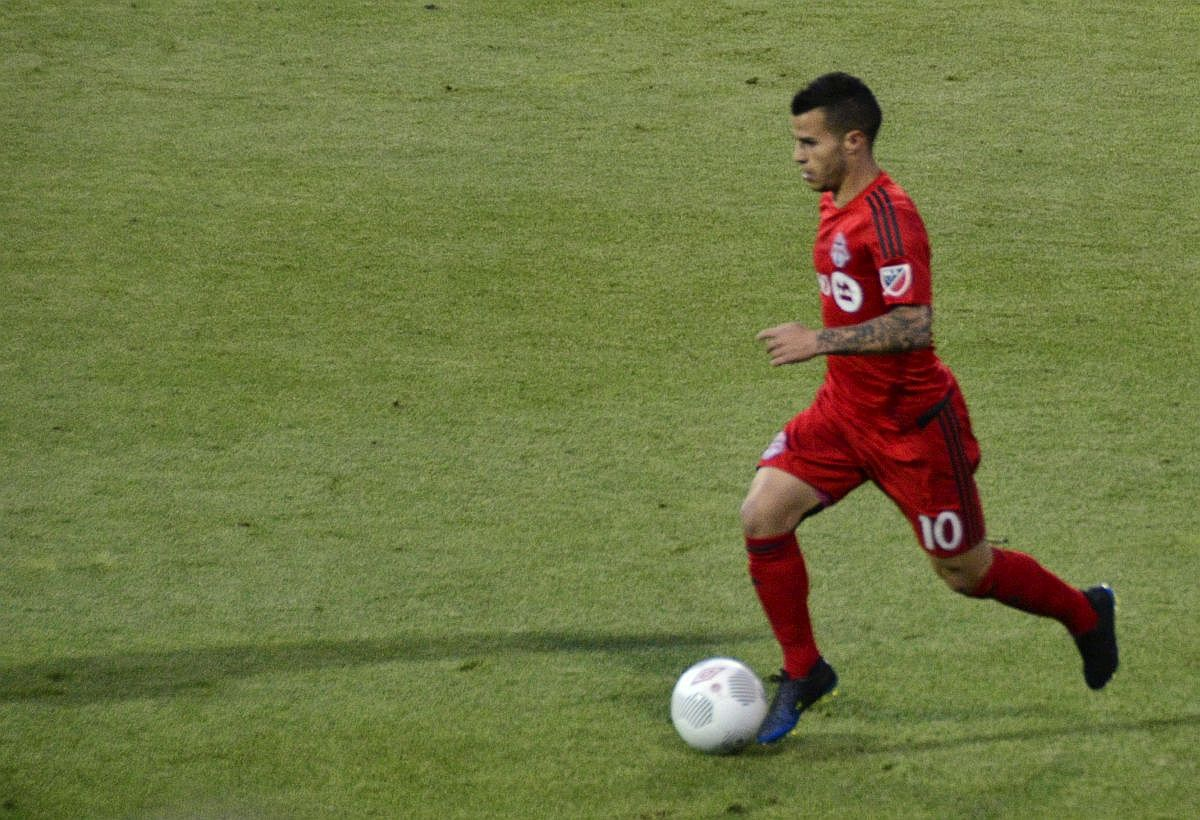
Sebastian Giovinco with Toronto FC, May 2015. Giovinco was the first player in club history to be awarded the MLS Golden Boot.

Michael Bradley was named team captain in 2015, following the retirement of Steven Caldwell, and would become the longest-serving captain of the club. On September 26, 2015, Giovinco scored and assisted in a 3–2 win over Chicago, putting him on 35 points for the season, breaking Chris Wondolowski's league record. Giovinco's totals of 22 goals and 16 assists, for 38 total points, made him the first TFC player to win the MLS Golden Boot, MLS MVP and MLS Newcomer of the Year Award. He was named to the MLS All-Star Game and the MLS Best XI and became the first player in MLS history to lead the league in both goals and assists in a single season. Toronto FC clinched a playoff berth on October 14, for the first time in franchise history. The team were eliminated in the knockout round of the 2015 MLS Cup Playoffs by a 3–0 loss at Canadian Classique rivals Montreal Impact.

On June 29, 2016, Toronto FC won its fifth Canadian Championship against Vancouver 2–2 on aggregate, winning on away goals. Giovinco scored a hat-trick against D.C. United, on July 23, 2016, in a 4–1 home win, surpassing De Rosario's previous all-time record as Toronto FC's top scorer by two goals to 35 goals. In October 2016, Toronto FC clinched a playoff spot for the second straight season. The team proceeded to defeat the Philadelphia Union at BMO Field in the Eastern Conference Knockout Round to record their first-ever playoff win and to secure entry into the first Eastern Conference Semi-final in franchise history. Toronto FC defeated New York City FC 7–0 on aggregate to reach an all-Canadian Eastern Conference finals derby against Montreal Impact. Montreal won the first leg of the Conference Championship, 3–2 at the Olympic Stadium in Montreal on November 22. Toronto beat Montreal 5–2 in extra time in the return leg at BMO Field in Toronto on November 30, winning on an aggregated score of 7–5, making Toronto FC the first Canadian team to compete in an MLS Cup Final. On December 10, Toronto lost the final at home to Seattle Sounders FC 5–4 in penalty shoot-out following a goalless draw after extra-time.

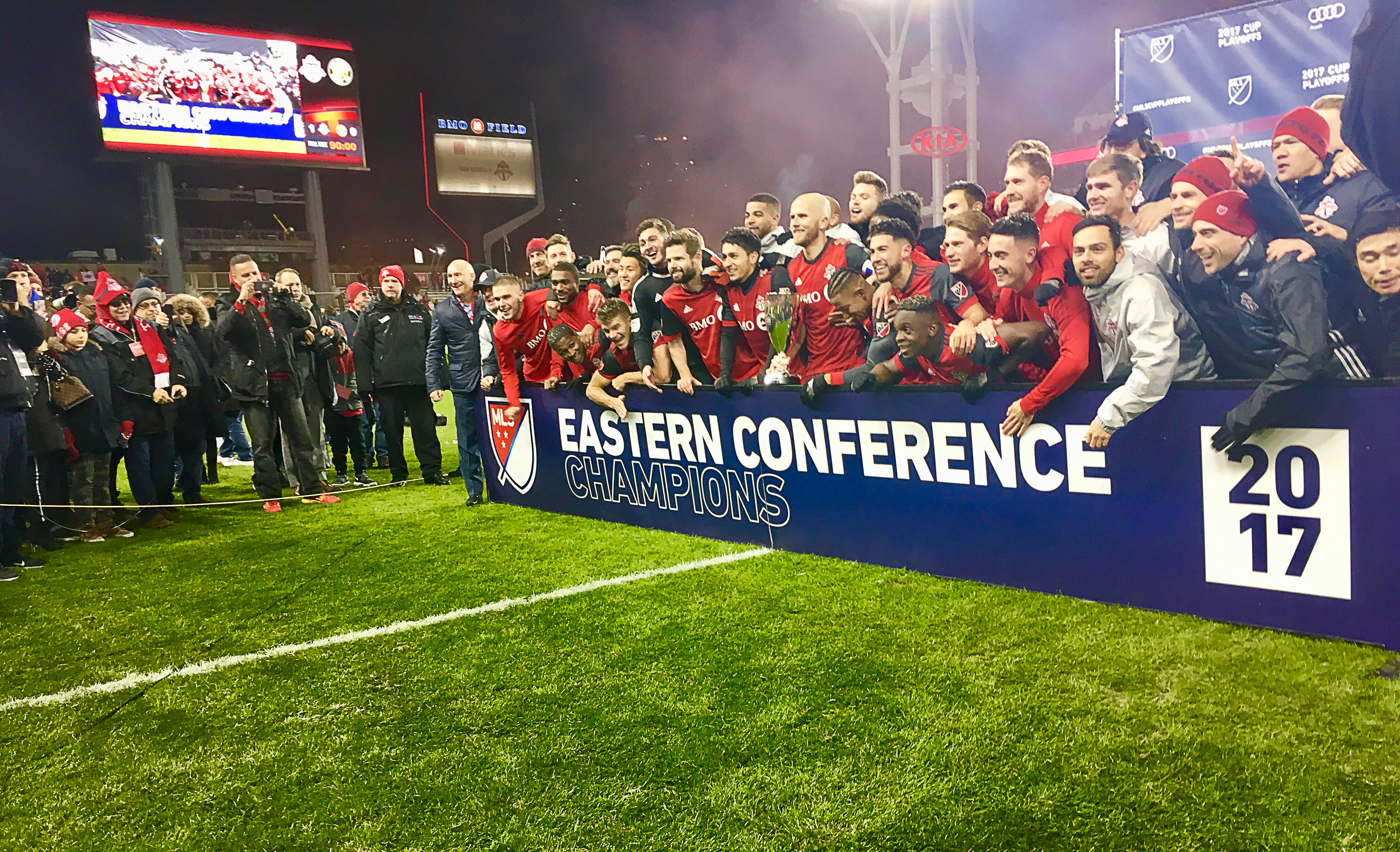
Members of Toronto FC taking a group photograph in BMO Field after being crowned as the Eastern Conference playoff champions in 2017

On June 27, 2017, Toronto FC won their sixth Canadian Championship 3–2 on aggregate over Montreal, earning them a spot in the 2018 CONCACAF Champions League. On September 30, Toronto FC won their first Supporters' Shield with a 4–2 home win over New York Red Bulls to clinch top of the league with the most points that season. By doing so, they also became the first Canadian team to win the Supporters' Shield. On October 22, the final day of the season, they played to a 2–2 away result against Atlanta United FC, where Toronto FC set a new MLS regular season points record with 69, eclipsing the 1998 LA Galaxy by one point. On November 29, 2017, Toronto FC won the Eastern Conference finals for the second time in a row, with a 1–0 aggregate win over Columbus Crew, also entering the MLS Cup Final for the second time in a row. On December 9, 2017, at home, Toronto FC defeated Seattle 2–0 in the MLS Cup, which was a rematch of the previous year's MLS Cup. Toronto FC became the first MLS team to complete a domestic treble with their win, as well as the first Canadian team to win the MLS Cup.

=== Post-MLS Cup win (2018–present) ===
Toronto FC started the 2018 season with a 2–0 away win over the Colorado Rapids in the 2018 CONCACAF Champions League round of 16 on February 20. After a goalless draw in the return leg against Colorado on February 27, TFC were matched up with Mexican side Tigres UANL for the quarterfinals, where they won the first leg 2–1 at home. In the return leg on March 13 in Mexico, TFC lost the match 3–2, however progressed to the semi-finals for the second time in its history since the 2011–12 Champions League, on away goals, following a 4–4 draw on aggregate. On April 10, TFC drew 1–1 to Club América at the Estadio Azteca in the second leg of the semi-final after a 3–1 home win on April 3 in the first leg, to advance 4–2 on aggregate to the finals for the first time in their history. After a 2–1 home loss to Guadalajara on April 17 in the first leg of the CONCACAF Champions League final, Toronto FC would win the return away leg 2–1 on April 25, leading to a draw on aggregate, but lost 4–2 in the penalty shootout. Later in the season, on September 19, Toronto FC played against Tigres UANL in the inaugural Campeones Cup, losing the match 3–1 at home. They failed to qualify for the playoffs after a 2–1 home loss against Vancouver on October 6, 2018, with three games left to play in the season.

During the 2018–19 off-season, on January 4, 2019, Toronto FC announced the appointment of Ali Curtis as general manager after the departure of Bezbatchenko. After failing to reach a contract agreement with the club, on January 30, 2019, Toronto FC sold Giovinco to Saudi Arabian club Al Hilal for an undisclosed fee. The club's fortunes took a turn for the worse after Bezbatchenko and his influence wore off. Between 2021 and 2025, Toronto FC finished consecutively 26th, 27th, 29th, 22nd, and 25th overall in the league.

On March 4, 2019, Spaniard Alejandro Pozuelo signed with Toronto FC as a designated player to help fill the void left by the recently departed Sebastian Giovinco and compatriot Víctor Vázquez in the creative midfield role. Pozuelo inherited the number ten shirt, which had previously been worn by the Italian. On June 26, 2019, Japanese forward Tsubasa Endoh scored the fastest goal in TFC history, only 29 seconds into the game against Atlanta United FC. After missing the playoffs the previous season, they qualified for the 2019 Playoffs. Toronto FC progressed to the final on November 10, 2019, where they faced the Seattle Sounders for the third time in four of the then-most recent MLS Cup finals held; Toronto FC was ultimately defeated in Seattle by a score of 3–1.

On February 7, 2020, Toronto FC signed Argentine Pablo Piatti as a designated player, while Michael Bradley signed a new contract below the designated player salary, while remaining as captain.

Marking the return of soccer after its suspension due to the COVID-19 pandemic, during the MLS is Back Tournament at the ESPN Wide World of Sports Complex in Bay Lake, Florida, Toronto FC reached the round of 16, but they lost 3–1 to New York City FC on July 16, 2020. Following the MLS is Back Tournament, due to Canadian government restrictions relating to the COVID-19 pandemic, Toronto FC played its six regular-season home matches at Pratt & Whitney Stadium at Rentschler Field in East Hartford, Connecticut.

On December 1, 2020, Vanney stepped down as head coach and technical director after seven years with the team, calling it a "personal family decision". He left as the team's longest-tenured and best-record coach. Chris Armas, the former New York Red Bulls coach, was appointed to the role on January 13, 2021.

During the 2021 season, Toronto FC played some of their home games in Exploria Stadium in Orlando, Florida, also home to Orlando City SC. After a poor run in the early season, which reached its nadir with the worst loss in club history on July 3, Armas was fired and replaced by interim coach Javier Pérez. Toronto played their first game back at BMO Field on July 17, 2021, against Orlando City SC with 7,000 in attendance. It was the first sporting event in Ontario since COVID-19 restrictions were implemented. On August 9, Pérez was officially named the head coach for the remainder of the season, removing the interim title. Toronto FC finished the season in second-last place, and on November 22, 2021, Curtis left his post as general manager. Two days later, Bob Bradley (father of Toronto FC captain Michael Bradley) was announced as the head coach replacement for Pérez, and in the same announcement, Bob Bradley was also named sporting director.

==== 2022: Italian influx ====
On January 8, 2022, Italian international Lorenzo Insigne signed with Toronto FC as a winger on a free transfer; the contract is a four-year deal and began on July 1. Toronto FC also signed Italian defender Domenico Criscito on June 29, 2022, to a TAM deal. On July 15, 2022, they were joined by compatriot Federico Bernardeschi, who signed with Toronto FC; the contract is also a four-year deal. Both Insigne and Bernardeschi signed as designated players. Canadian internationals Doneil Henry, Mark-Anthony Kaye, and Richie Laryea were also acquired.

The 2022–2023 off-season saw further overhaul of the club roster, including the additions of American Matt Hedges and Norwegian Adama Diomande, and the return of Victor Vazquez.

==== 2023: Downturn and management changes ====
The 2023 season for Toronto FC was marked by significant challenges, both on and off the field, leading to a period of transition and change within the club. Despite a full offseason with Insigne and Bernardeschi, and other new additions, the team struggled to find consistency and form, culminating in a season of disappointing results that saw Toronto FC languishing near the bottom of the MLS Eastern Conference standings. Injuries marred the team, with new signings Diomande, Alonso Coello, and Raoul Petretta notably requiring longer-term recoveries.

The persistent underperformance led to the dismissal of Bob Bradley in June 2023, after managing only one win in eleven games, a decision that underscored the depth of the club's crisis. Around this time, reports had surfaced that the club was suffering an internal crisis, with a fractured locker room and a hostile culture among players and management. Bradley's departure was followed by the appointment of TFC-alumni Jason Hernandez as General Manager Terry Dunfield as interim head coach, in a position he remained in until John Herdman's arrival as the new long-term head coach with one game remaining in the season. This era was characterized by introspection within the club, with a focus on developing a cohesive team strategy, fostering a culture of accountability, and leveraging the club's youth talent to build a competitive squad for the future. During this season, young talent such as Kobe Franklin and Deandre Kerr emerged as regular contributors to the team.

==== 2024–present: Rebuilding under Herdman and Fraser ====
Toronto FC's 2024 roster saw the appointment of Jonathan Osorio as club captain and a recommitment from stars Insigne and Bernardeschi. Notable signings to begin the season included the return of Richie Laryea completed via a transfer from Nottingham Forest and the signing of Kevin Long from Birmingham. Honduran international Deybi Flores, former Newcastle player Matty Longstaff, and Sheffield United youth defender Nicksoen Gomis also joined the team.

The club secured a 0–0 result away against FC Cincinnati in its first game of the season, with notable performances by Sean Johnson, who secured his 100th MLS shutout, and debutant Flores.

TFC would enjoy a positive start to the season, winning three of their subsequent four games and managing to equal the points total they achieved in the entirety of the 2023 season (22) by late May, following a 0–0 draw with the Philadelphia Union. However, despite an increased optimism from fans hoping to secure a post-season berth for the first time in half a decade, the team would collapse in the second half of the season, winning just 15 of a possible 54 points and missing the playoffs by just three points.

After a disappointing 2024 Major League Soccer season, Toronto FC announced the resignation of head coach John Herdman on November 29, 2024. Herdman, who had joined the club in October 2023 after leaving his role as head coach of the Canada men's national team, oversaw a period of continued rebuilding. Toronto finished 11th in the Eastern Conference in 2024 and missed the MLS Cup Playoffs for the fourth consecutive season.

On January 10, 2025, Toronto FC appointed Robin Fraser as head coach on a multi-year contract. Fraser previously served as an assistant coach during Toronto's most successful era under Greg Vanney and later as head coach of the Colorado Rapids. The club cited Fraser's MLS experience and familiarity with the organization as key factors in the appointment.

During the 2025 MLS season, Toronto FC finished 12th in the Eastern Conference and 25th overall in the league standings, again failing to qualify for the playoffs. The team struggled with offensive consistency throughout the campaign and was eliminated in the early stages of the Canadian Championship in a home defeat against CF Montréal. The season marked the beginning of a significant roster restructuring, with Toronto FC parting ways with Lorenzo Insigne and Federico Bernardeschi as part of a broader rebuild that included the acquisition of Djordje Mihailovic as a new Designated Player.

Ahead of the 2026 season, the club continued reshaping its squad under Fraser. In January 2026, Toronto FC signed veteran centre-back Walker Zimmerman to strengthen the defensive unit. With the departure of starting goalkeeper Sean Johnson following the 2025 season, Toronto FC turned to Toronto FC II product Luka Gavran as the club's projected first-choice goalkeeper heading into 2026, signalling a renewed emphasis on internal development and youth integration during the ongoing rebuild. Entering the 2026 MLS season, Toronto FC remained under Fraser's management, aiming to end its playoff drought and establish greater stability following multiple transitional seasons.

== Stadium ==
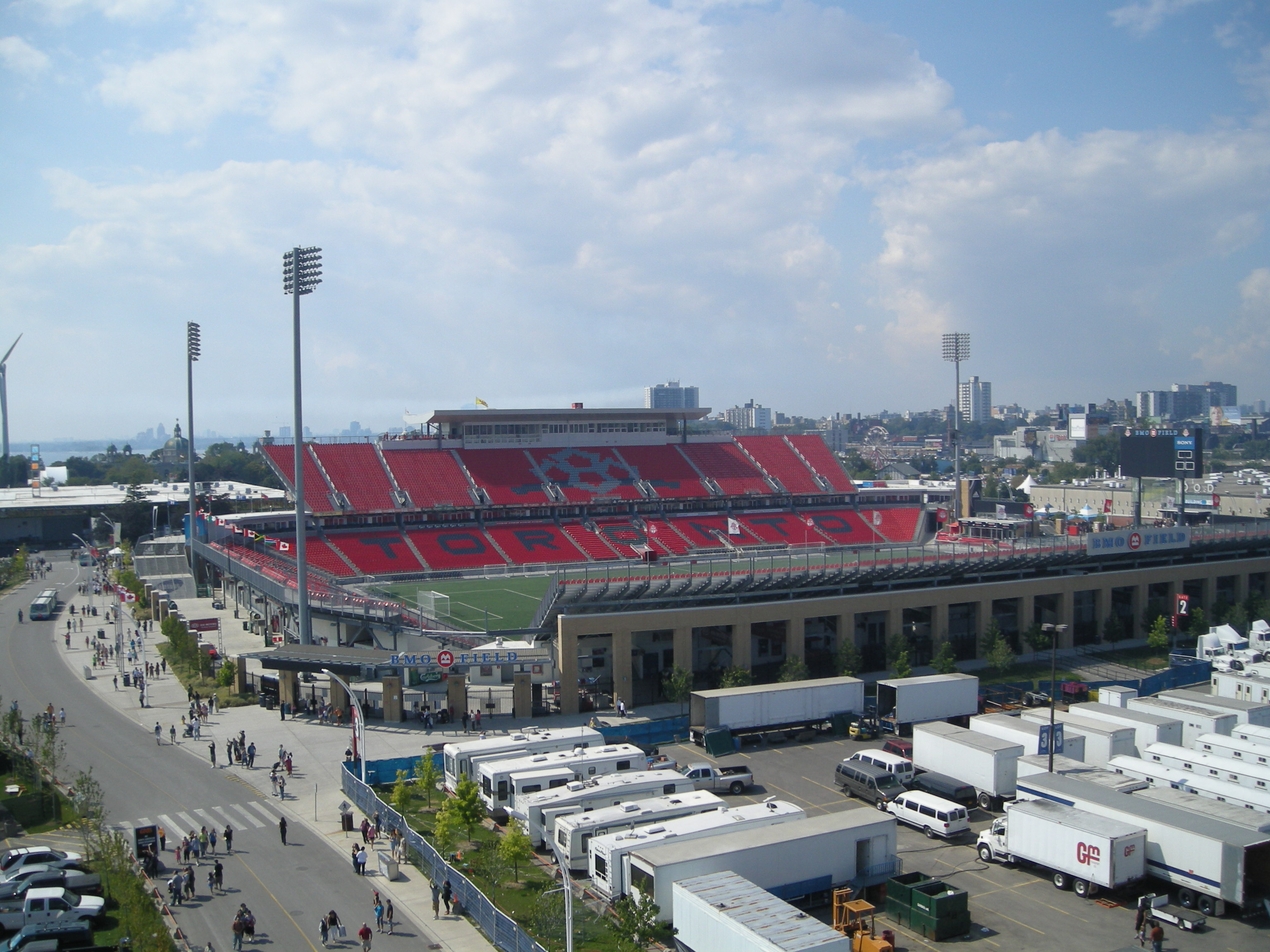
Pre-expansion in 2009

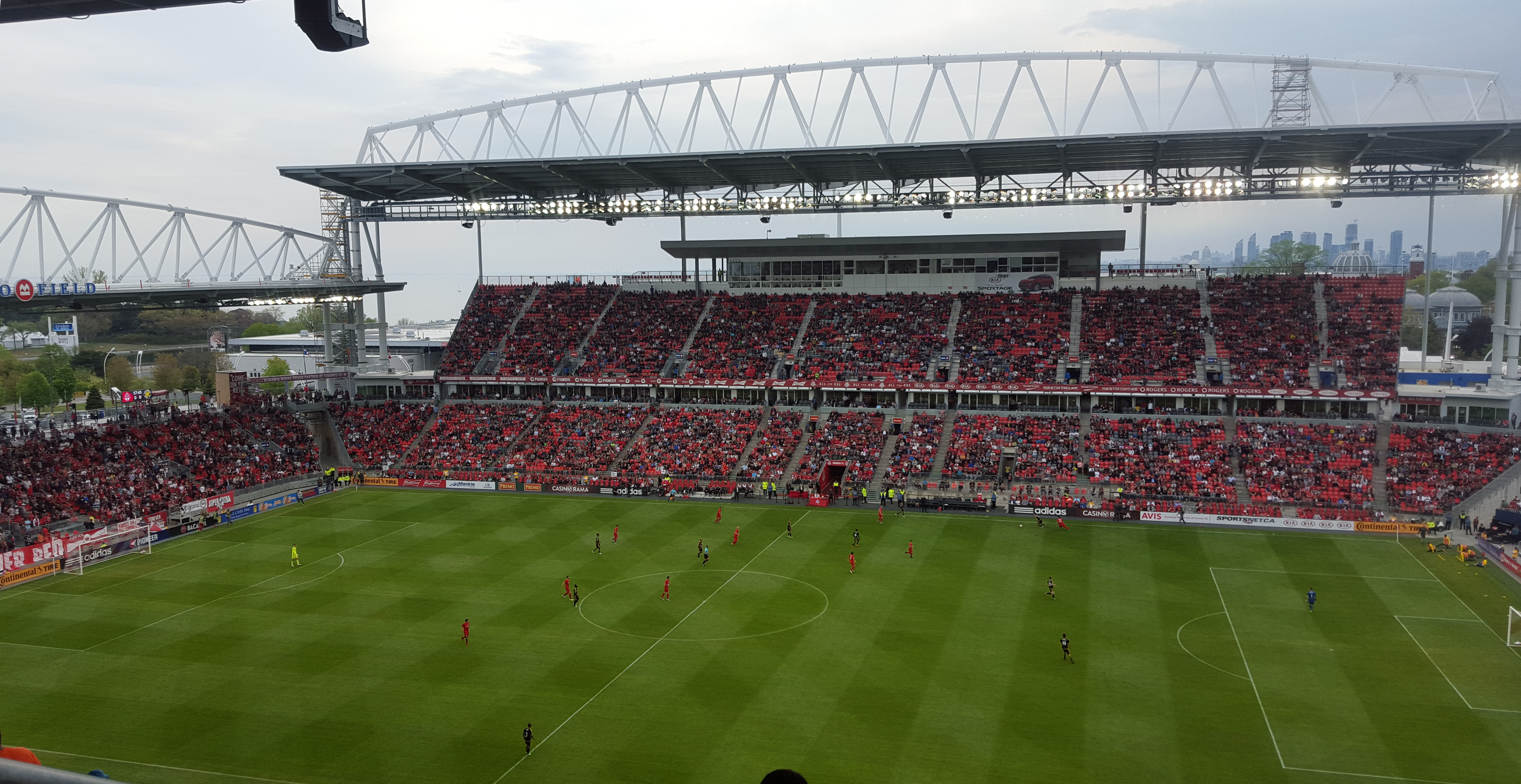
Post-expansion in 2016

BMO Field in Toronto, Ontario

Before the 2007 Major League Soccer season, construction was completed on a new stadium at Exhibition Place in Toronto at a cost of $62.5 million. On September 20, 2006, MLS's official website announced that BMO Financial Group had purchased the naming rights for the new stadium. It is the largest soccer-specific stadium in Canada. It is owned by the City of Toronto, while MLSE, the team's owner, operates it.

Following criticism of BMO Field's use of FieldTurf and its rapid deterioration, MLSE agreed to a deal with the city to replace it with a natural grass surface in time for the 2010 MLS Season. Along with the grass, a heating and drainage system was also installed for $3.5 million to MLSE.

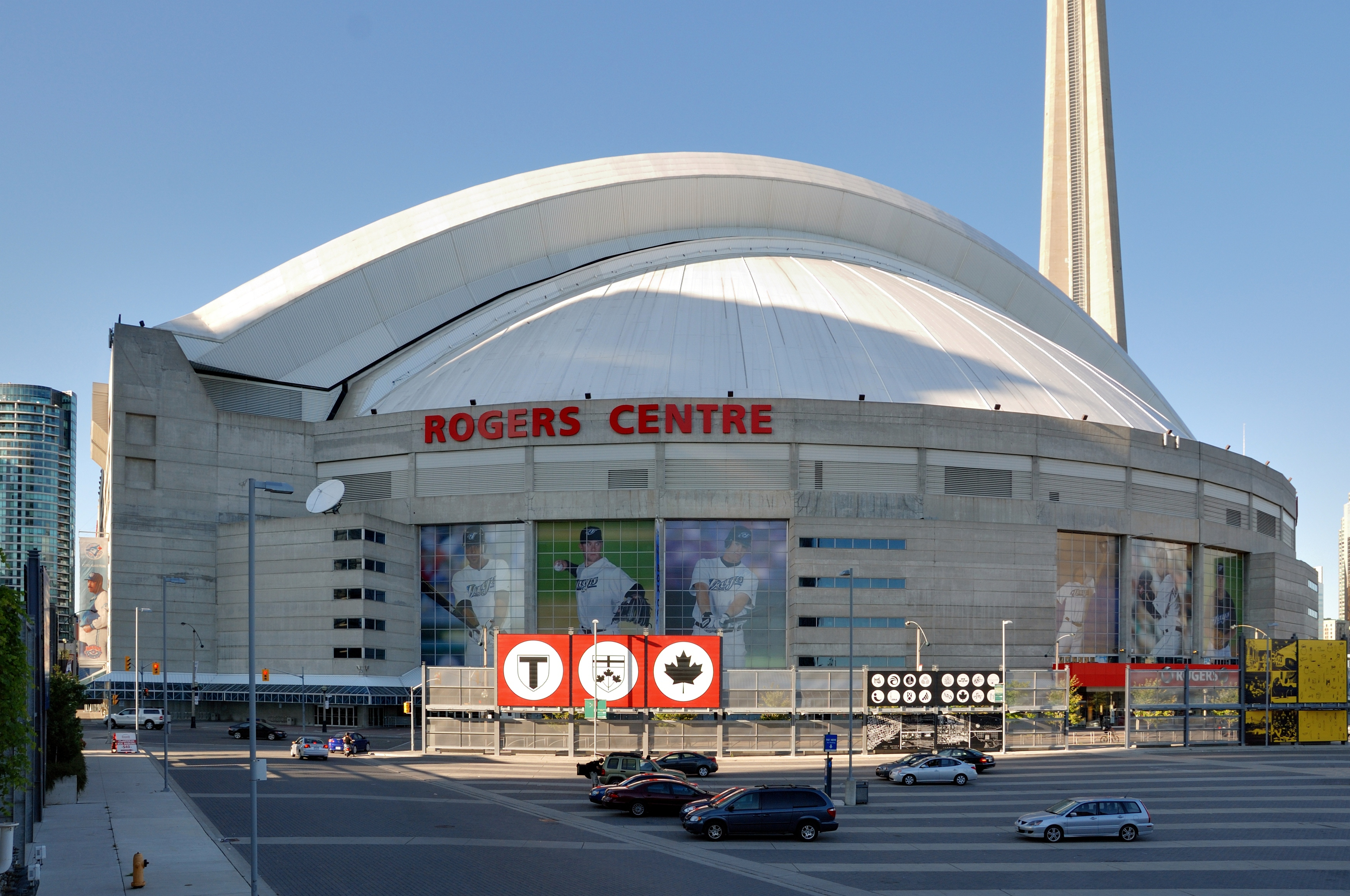
Toronto FC games are very occasionally played in the Rogers Centre, home of Major League Baseball's Toronto Blue Jays.

In March 2012, TFC played its first-ever match in the Rogers Centre, the 49,982-seat home of Major League Baseball's Toronto Blue Jays and former home of the Argonauts and the Toronto Raptors, hosting the LA Galaxy in the home leg of the 2011–12 CONCACAF Champions League championship round. The retractable roof stadium was also the venue for a friendly against Liverpool of the English Premier League in July of that year and their only MLS home match in Toronto away from BMO Field, the 2013 home opener against Sporting Kansas City on March 9, 2013, with a then-record Toronto FC home MLS attendance of 25,991.

=== Expansion ===
Expansion to the north end that cost $2 million, added 1,249 seats and was completed for the start of the 2010 MLS Season. A$120 million renovation to the stadium was officially announced September 23, 2014. It included a second tier of seating that added 8,400 seats, raising the capacity of the stadium to 30,991. New suites, washrooms, concourse and a roof were added. Construction began in September 2014 and would be divided into two phases; the completion of the project was set for May 2016. The expansion would accommodate a Canadian football field with artificial turf end-zones when the Toronto Argonauts move to BMO Field in 2016, along with hosting the Grey Cup that year.

=== Stadiums during the COVID-19 pandemic ===
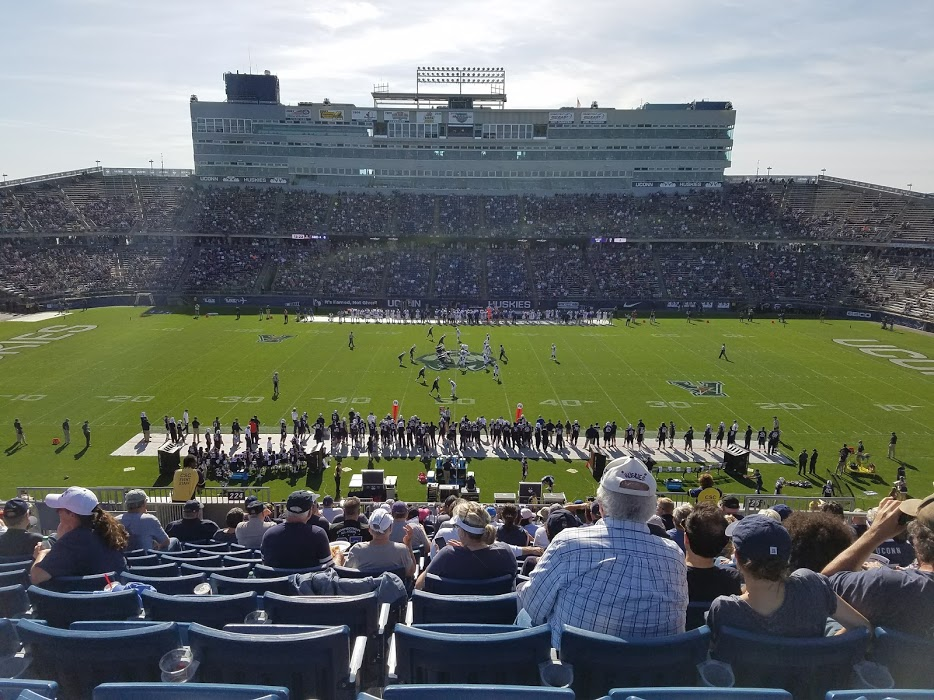
Pratt & Whitney Stadium in East Hartford, Connecticut

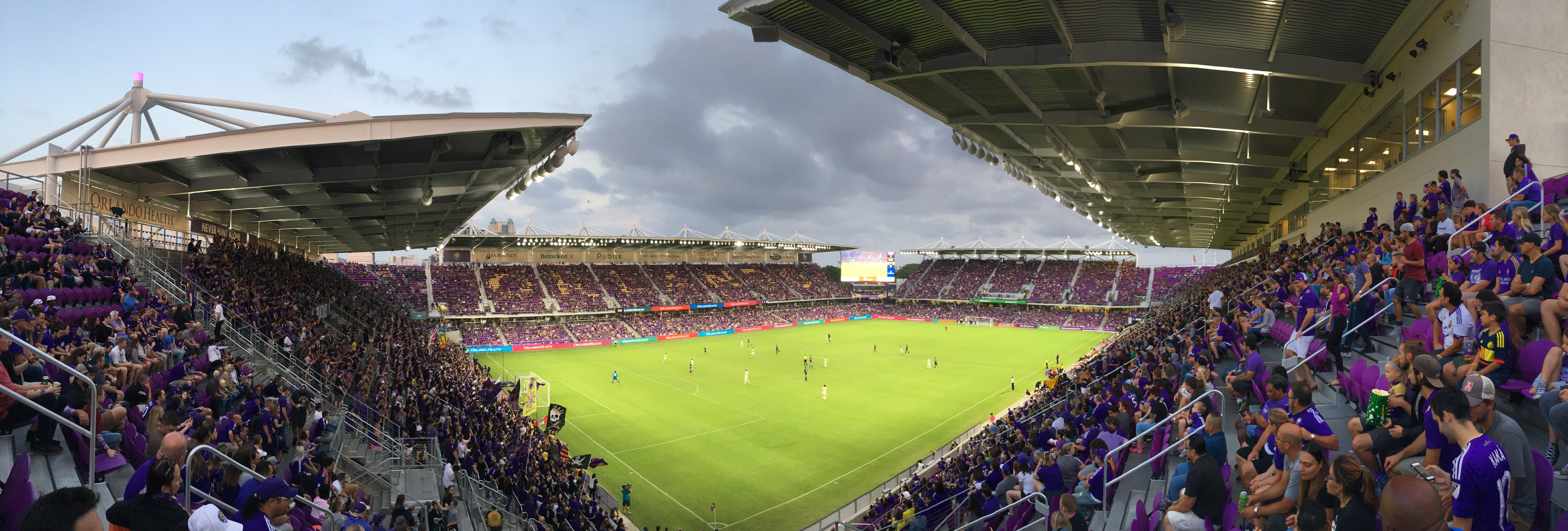
Exploria Stadium in Orlando, Florida

Toronto FC played some of its home games in American-based venues during the 2020 season and 2021 season to limit travel between Canada and the United States amid the COVID-19 pandemic

On September 11, 2020, Connecticut governor Ned Lamont announced that Toronto FC would finish their season's home matches at Pratt & Whitney Stadium in East Hartford, Connecticut, as well as during the playoffs, due to the Canadian government's response to limit cross-border travel during the COVID-19 pandemic. Likewise, Toronto FC played some of their home games in Exploria Stadium in Orlando, Florida during the 2021 season. Exploria Stadium is also home to Orlando City SC of MLS.

=== 2026 FIFA World Cup renovations ===
Ahead of the 2026 FIFA World Cup, Toronto's BMO Field—renamed Toronto Stadium for the tournament under FIFA's neutral naming rules—underwent a substantial renovation to meet international standards and accommodate the event's crowds. The project, part of a roughly CAD 146 million upgrade shared between the City of Toronto and Maple Leaf Sports & Entertainment, was carried out in phases since late 2024 and includes expanded seating capacity to approximately 45,736 through the addition of around 17,000 temporary seats, upgraded broadcast infrastructure, new LED video boards, improved Wi-Fi, and enhanced hospitality and concession areas to elevate the fan experience. Temporary enhancements such as new team dugouts, improved lighting and sound systems, and expanded lounges aim to ensure the venue complies with FIFA requirements while offering a world-class setting for the six tournament matches it hosted, including the first World Cup home game for the Canada men's national soccer team on June 12, 2026.

== Club culture ==
=== Supporters ===
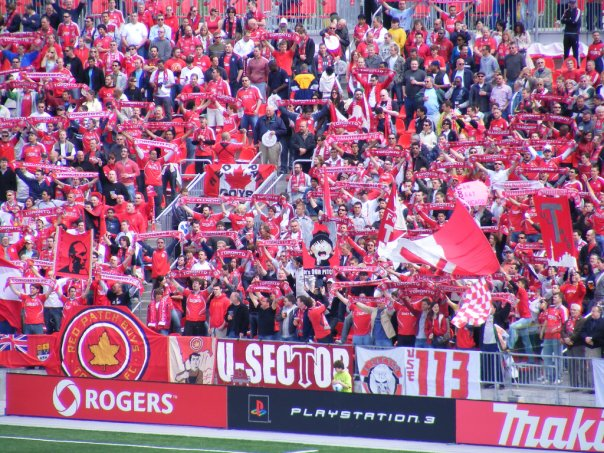
Fans celebrate at a Toronto FC match during the club's inaugural season in 2007

Toronto FC's initial seasons saw TFC fans set the standard for MLS fan support, selling out its first three seasons. Referred to as the model franchise off the field by MLS commissioner Don Garber, the team was credited for starting "MLS 2.0" for their embrace of supporters' culture. Lack of on-field success caused frustration among the fanbase, spurring fan protests against ownership. In response, MLSE acknowledged the lack of quality on the on-field product, lowering ticket prices in 2013 to 2007 levels. Following a resurgence of interest in the team due to the major signings of designated players Jermain Defoe and Michael Bradley, the team capped season tickets at 17,000 for the 2014 season.

Toronto FC's recognized supporters' groups are the Red Patch Boys, U-Sector, Kings in the North, Tribal Rhythm Nation and Original 109. On August 23, 2018, Toronto FC permanently terminated Inebriatti's supporter status for a fire they started at TD Place Stadium in Ottawa during their match-up with Toronto FC in the Canadian Championship earlier that year on July 18.

=== Mascot ===
Bitchy the Hawk is a female Harris's hawk employed by BMO Field falconry staff to sit perched atop the field to ward off incoming seagulls, known as the BMO Field Guardian. Originally brought to work in 2007 when BMO Field opened to prevent seagulls from attacking patrons, the hawk has become a fixture of the stadium. She has also been employed at Molson Canadian Amphitheatre (renamed Budweiser Stage in 2018 due to a change in naming rights between the multinational breweries and later RBC Amphitheatre) in Ontario Place to the south to prevent seagulls from attacking concert-goers since the 1990s. While no official word has come from the club about her status, fans and the media consider her the mascot of the team. Various other hawks have served as the BMO Field Guardian since Bitchy, including Hudson the Hawk. The Canadian Raptor Conservancy provides the hawks that serve as the BMO Field Guardian. In 2025, the club added a steel statue of a hawk above the Supporters Section, which was created by a fan. In 2012, the club made the hawk symbol as the "symbolic overseer of BMO Field," and included a hawk in the official logo of the Toronto FC Academy.

=== Rivalries ===
The club shares a soccer rivalry with several clubs in the MLS, including the Columbus Crew and CF Montréal. Toronto FC also have a rivalry with the other Canadian team, the Vancouver Whitecaps FC. CF Montréal and Vancouver Whitecaps FC compete with Toronto FC in the Canadian Championships.

==== CF Montréal ====
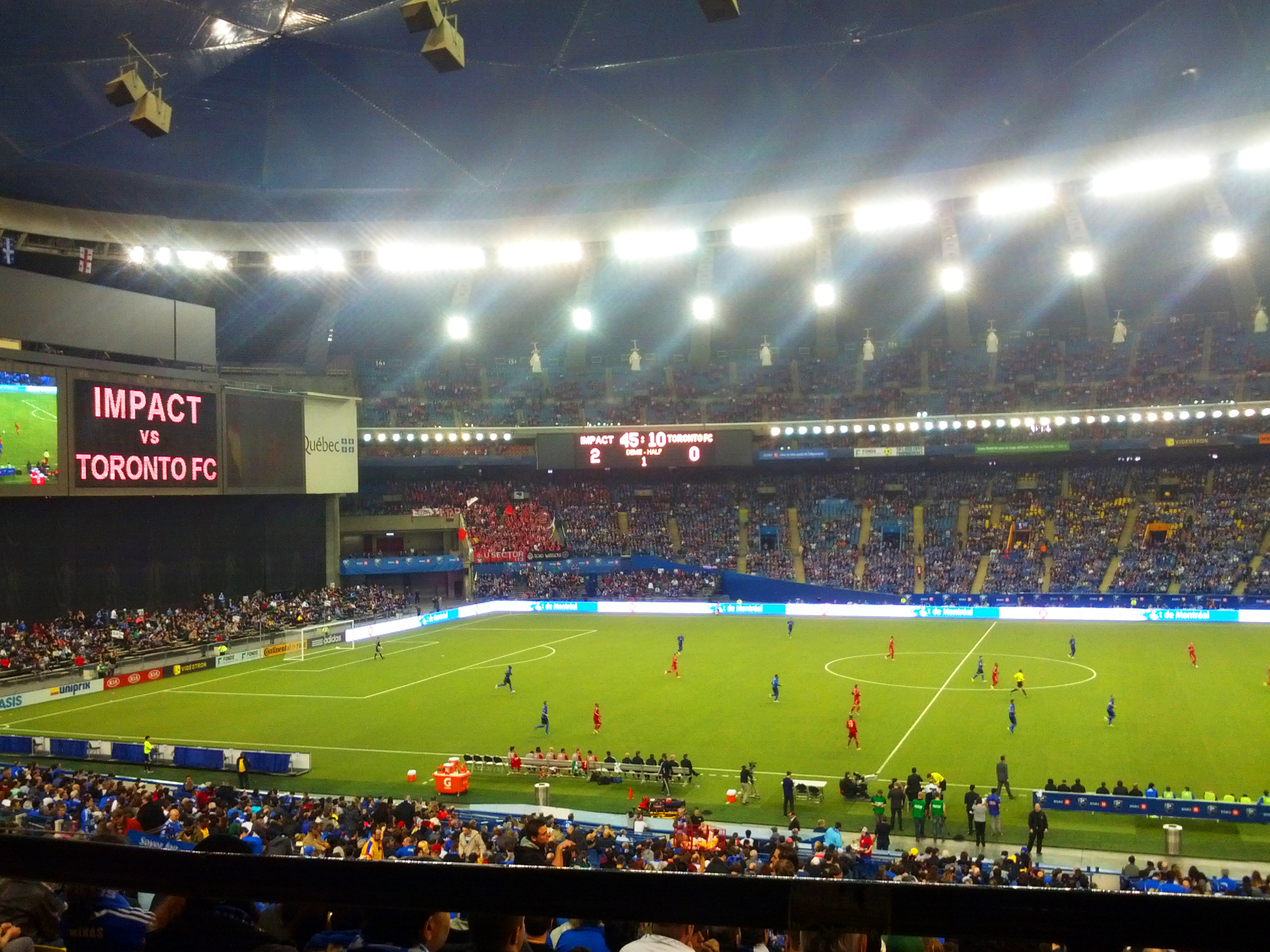
A match between Toronto FC and Montreal Impact in Olympic Stadium in Montreal, March 2013. The two clubs share a soccer rivalry referred to as the Canadian Classique, which later continues as the Impact became CF Montréal.

Toronto FC's biggest rival, CF Montréal (formerly known as Montreal Impact), joined MLS in 2012. In the years leading up to this, they emerged as fierce rivals during the Canadian Championship. The proximity of the two cities and the fact that Toronto and Montreal are long-standing rivals in the National Hockey League (NHL) contributes to these meetings being combative. Since both teams have joined MLS, the rivalry has intensified and the matches have become a Canadian soccer classic, nicknamed the 401 Derby after Ontario Highway 401, a freeway that indirectly links the two cities (alongside Quebec Autoroute 20). The rivalry is also known as the Canadian Classique.

On March 16, 2013, Toronto FC fans set an MLS record for travelling support with 3,200 away fans in Montreal to watch TFC lose 2–1, eclipsing their own record of 2,400 at Columbus Crew in 2008.

The 2016 MLS Cup Eastern Conference finals were part of the 401 Derby as well, with Toronto FC winning the series 7–5 on aggregate.

==== Columbus Crew ====
Columbus Crew and Toronto FC have competed for the Trillium Cup since 2008. Although a manufactured rivalry, albeit linked by the fact that the official flower of both Ontario and Ohio is the white trillium (Trillium grandiflorum), the meetings have since sparked bitterness. On March 28, 2009, approximately 1,700 Toronto FC supporters travelled to Columbus Crew Stadium and witnessed a 1–1 draw, during which they lit a number of flares and committed vandalism. Following the game, some altercations broke out between the two supporter groups. Overwhelmed security called local police who ended the melees and made arrests, at which time a Toronto FC fan was tasered while being subdued. The first rematch back in Columbus Crew Stadium following the incident was boycotted by Toronto FC supporters in wake of restrictions imposed on them by Crew officials.

The 2017 MLS Cup Eastern Conference finals were part of the Trillium Cup as well, with Toronto FC winning the series 1–0 on aggregate.

=== Colours and sponsorship ===
The official team colours include red and white as the primary colours, with black, grey, and dark grey as secondary colours.

The primary uniform (jersey, shorts, and socks) is red with alternating lighter and darker horizontal bands, black sleeves with red trim, and a vertical black band below each sleeve extending the full length of the jersey. The secondary uniform includes white jerseys with a large red horizontal band below a smaller blue band across the chest with blue and red trim, white socks with blue trim, and with either red or blue shorts (the choice of which is subject to the opponent's uniform to prevent confusion). In its first three seasons, Toronto FC's secondary uniform colours were light and dark grey. In the following four seasons, the team wore white secondary uniforms, whereas in 2014, the secondary uniforms were changed to onyx. As with all MLS teams, the uniforms are produced by Adidas. In 2013 and 2014, a shadow-print maple leaf was featured on Toronto FC's primary jerseys.

Since the team's formation in 2007, it has been sponsored by the Bank of Montreal (BMO). The sponsorship was worth $1–1.5 million per season, but in 2010, a new five-year deal worth $4 million per season was signed. In February 2016, it was announced that BMO had extended its sponsorship agreement by another ten years.

2007–08
2009–10
2011–12
2013–14
2015–16
2017–18
2019–20
2021–22
2023–

2007–08
2009–10
2010–11
2012–13
2014–15
2016–17
2018–19
2020–21
2022–2023
2024–

== Ownership ==
Toronto FC are operated by Maple Leaf Sports & Entertainment (MLSE), which also operates the National Hockey League's Toronto Maple Leafs (and the American Hockey League's Toronto Marlies by extension), the National Basketball Association's Toronto Raptors (and the NBA G League's Raptors 905 by extension), the Canadian Football League's Toronto Argonauts, and MLS Next Pro's Toronto FC II. MLSE also own and operate sports ventures like Leafs Nation Network and NBA TV Canada.

The company is also involved in real estate and property management, owning such sports venues as the Scotiabank Arena in downtown Toronto and being a partner in the development of the nearby Maple Leaf Square. The partners of Maple Leaf Sports & Entertainment are Larry Tanenbaum and rival media outlets Rogers Communications and Bell Media; Rogers and Bell own each of the primary English-language sports television outlets in Canada (Sportsnet and TSN, respectively). However, in late 2024, Rogers announced that it had reached an agreement to buy out Bell's share in MLSE, with closing expected by the middle of 2025; Bell would retain some broadcasting rights to Toronto FC games on TSN.

== Players and staff ==
=== Roster ===
As of September 12, 2026

Note: Flags indicate national team as defined under FIFA eligibility rules; some limited exceptions apply. Players may hold more than one non-FIFA nationality.

| No. | Pos. | Nation | Player |
|---|---|---|---|
| 1 | GK | CAN | Luka Gavran |
| 3 | DF | BRA | Matheus Pereira |
| 6 | MF | GER | Niklas Dorsch |
| 7 | FW | CAN | Theo Corbeanu |
| 8 | MF | COL | Nelson Palacio |
| 9 | FW | USA | Josh Sargent (DP) |
| 10 | MF | USA | Djordje Mihailovic (DP) |
| 11 | MF | HAI | Derrick Etienne Jr. |
| 12 | DF | ENG | Zane Monlouis |
| 13 | DF | CHI | Benjamín Kuscevic (on loan from Fortaleza) |
| 14 | MF | ESP | Alonso Coello |
| 15 | DF | FRA | Nicksoen Gomis |
| 17 | FW | COL | Emilio Aristizábal (on loan from Atlético Nacional) |
| 19 | DF | CAN | Kobe Franklin (HG) |
| 20 | FW | HUN | Dániel Sallói |
| 21 | MF | CAN | Jonathan Osorio (captain) |

| No. | Pos. | Nation | Player |
|---|---|---|---|
| 22 | DF | CAN | Richie Laryea |
| 23 | GK | USA | William Yarbrough |
| 25 | DF | USA | Walker Zimmerman |
| 27 | FW | COL | Alejandro Piedrahita (on loan from CSKA Sofia) |
| 38 | DF | USA | Jackson Gilman |
| 44 | DF | CAN | Raheem Edwards |
| 56 | MF | CAN | Antone Bossenberry (HG) |
| 71 | MF | SLO | Markus Cimermancic (HG) |
| 76 | DF | CAN | Lazar Stefanovic (HG) |
| 77 | GK | CAN | Adisa De Rosario (HG) |
| 78 | MF | CAN | Malik Henry |
| 90 | FW | SCO | Lewis Morgan |
| 96 | DF | CAN | Richard Chukwu (HG) |
| 98 | DF | CAN | Stefan Kapor (HG) |
| 99 | FW | CAN | Jules-Anthony Vilsaint |

==== Out on loan ====
Note: Flags indicate national team as defined under FIFA eligibility rules; some limited exceptions apply. Players may hold more than one non-FIFA nationality.

| No. | Pos. | Nation | Player |
|---|---|---|---|
| 51 | DF | CAN | Adam Pearlman (HG; on loan to Cavalry FC) |

=== Current staff ===
As of February 21, 2025

Executive
| President | Vacant |
| General manager | (Puerto Rico) Jason Hernandez |
| Technical director | (United States) Sean Rubio |
Coaching staff
| Head coach | Vacant |
| Assistant coach | (Iran) Steven Beitashour |
| Assistant coach | (England) Neil Emblen |
| Assistant coach | (Jamaica) Wolde Harris |
| Goalkeeper coach | (New Zealand) Simon Eaddy |
| Video coach | (New Zealand) Jase Kim |
| Director of Performance | (Switzerland) Dr. César Meylan |
| Performance Analyst | (Canada) Peter Galindo |

=== Head coaches ===
As of November 7, 2026

| Coach | Nation | Tenure | Record^{1} | | | | |
| Coach | Nation | Tenure | G | W | L | T | Win % |
|---|---|---|---|---|---|---|---|
| Mo Johnston | Scotland | August 22, 2006 – February 1, 2008 | 30 | 6 | 17 | 7 | 20.00 |
| John Carver | England | February 1, 2008 – April 25, 2009 | 36 | 11 | 15 | 10 | 30.56 |
| Chris Cummins (interim) | England | April 29, 2009 – October 24, 2009 | 31 | 12 | 11 | 8 | 38.71 |
| Preki | United States | November 19, 2009 – September 14, 2010 | 32 | 11 | 11 | 10 | 34.38 |
| Nick Dasovic (interim) | Canada | September 14, 2010 – January 6, 2011 | 10 | 3 | 4 | 3 | 30.00 |
| Aron Winter | Netherlands | January 6, 2011 – June 7, 2012 | 64 | 18 | 25 | 21 | 28.13 |
| Paul Mariner | England | June 7, 2012 – January 7, 2013 | 28 | 6 | 14 | 8 | 21.43 |
| Ryan Nelsen | New Zealand | January 7, 2013 – August 31, 2014 | 64 | 17 | 29 | 18 | 26.56 |
| Greg Vanney | United States | August 31, 2014 – December 1, 2020 | 250 | 112 | 82 | 56 | 44.80 |
| Chris Armas | United States | January 13, 2021 – July 4, 2021 | 15 | 2 | 10 | 3 | 13.33 |
| Javier Pérez | Spain | July 4, 2021 – November 23, 2021 | 26 | 7 | 11 | 8 | 26.92 |
| Bob Bradley | United States | November 24, 2021 – June 26, 2023 | 59 | 14 | 26 | 19 | 23.73 |
| Terry Dunfield (interim) | Canada | June 26, 2023 – October 7, 2023 | 15 | 1 | 14 | 0 | 6.67 |
| John Herdman | England | October 8, 2023 – November 29, 2024^{2} | 44 | 16 | 22 | 6 | 36.36 |
| Robin Fraser | United States | January 10, 2025 – November 9, 2026 | 70 | 15 | 28 | 27 | 21.43 |

1.Includes league, playoff, Canadian Championship, CONCACAF Champions League, Campeones Cup, Leagues Cup, and MLS is Back Tournament games.
2.John Herdman was named head coach effective October 1, 2023, however, Terry Dunfield continued to serve as coach of the team through October 7.

=== General managers ===
As of June 26, 2023

| Name | Nation | Tenure |
| Mo Johnston | Scotland | 2008–2010 |
| Earl Cochrane (interim) | Canada | 2010–2011 |
| Kevin Payne | United States | 2012–2013 |
| Tim Bezbatchenko | United States | 2013–2019 |
| Ali Curtis | United States | 2019–2021 |
| Bob Bradley | United States | 2021–2023 |
| Jason Hernandez | Puerto Rico | 2023–present |

== Youth development ==
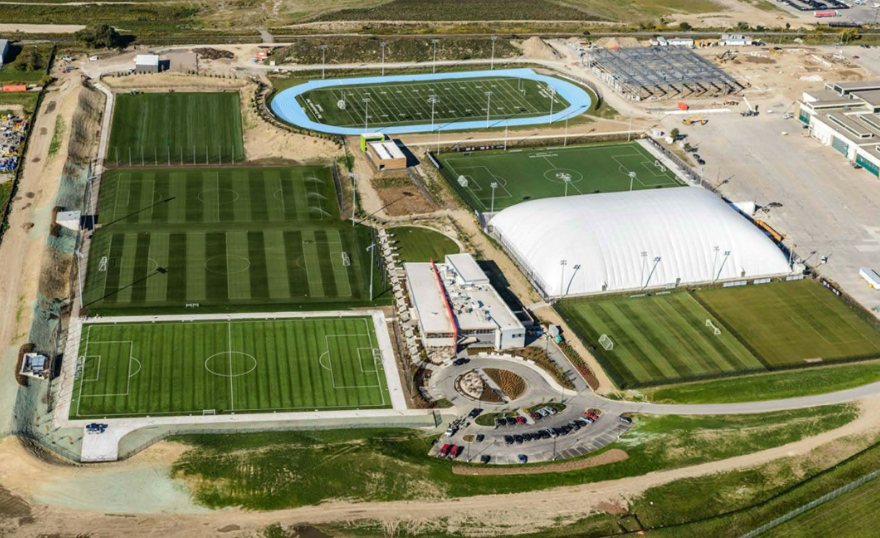
BMO Training Ground in Downsview Park serves as the home stadium for Toronto FC II, and Toronto FC Academy, the club's minor league, and youth development system

=== Toronto FC II ===
Toronto FC II was established in November 2014 and is the farm team of Toronto FC. Toronto FC II competes in MLS Next Pro, part of the third division of the American soccer league system, having previously played in the USL League One. The team serves as a reserve team for TFC and a bridge between the Academy and first team. The team began play in March 2015. Their home stadium was the then-newly constructed 3,500-seat stadium at the Ontario Soccer Centre in Vaughan, just north-northwest of Toronto. Jason Bent is the team's first head coach.

Toronto FC previously had a one-year partnership with the Wilmington Hammerheads of the USL in 2014.

For the 2018 season, TFC II moved its home games to BMO Field and Lamport Stadium. On July 2, 2018, the team announced they would move down from the United Soccer League to USL League One for the league's first season in 2019. With their drop to Division 3, the team moved their home games to BMO Training Ground. At the conclusion of the 2021 season, TFC II departed USL altogether for MLS Next Pro and moved their home games to York Lions Stadium. On July 14, 2026, it was announced the team would be relocated to Barrie for the 2028–29 season, to play at a new stadium to be constructed in the city.

=== TFC Academy ===
TFC Academy is the youth academy and development system of Toronto FC that was established in 2008. The academy consists of multiple teams spanning different age groups from U12 to U20. Starting in 2020, the senior academy squad (known as Toronto FC III) plays in the MLS Next.

In June 2012, TFC academy moved to their new practice facility originally named Kia Training Ground, but subsequently renamed BMO Training Ground as the former's naming rights expired at the end of 2017, located in Downsview Park in North York. Built at a cost of $21 million to MLSE, the facility has seven pitches: three full-sized grass pitches and four artificial turfs with two capable of being bubbled for year-round use. The 36,000-square-foot (3,300 m^{2}) facility also contains first team facilities, gym, kitchen, and offices.

==== TFC Juniors ====
The Toronto FC Juniors, also known as the TFC Juniors, is part of the youth academy and development system of Toronto FC. The program holds camps regionally and has held camps in Toronto, Pickering, Vaughan, Stoney Creek in Hamilton, Oakville, and Markham. The Toronto FC Juniors program is one of Toronto FC Academy's main sources for prospects alongside their network of scouts.

==== TFC Regional Partners ====
TFC Academy has made regional partnerships with local youth clubs in other Ontario cities re-branding under the TFC name: Windsor TFC, London TFC, Ottawa TFC, Kitchener TFC, Hamilton TFC, and DeRo TFC, the lattermost being based in Scarborough, the eastern district of Toronto. Windsor TFC was the re-branded name from Windsor Stars SC, whose senior team plays in League1 Ontario (L1O). London TFC was re-branded from FC London, whose senior team retained their name in L1O. Ottawa TFC was formed from a merger of Cumberland United SC and Capital United SC. Kitchener TFC rebranded from Kitchener SC, Hamilton TFC rebranded from Mount Hamilton Youth SC (Mount Hamilton is also part of the Hamilton United group that competes in League1 Ontario and Mount Hamilton is named after Hamilton Mountain) and DeRo TFC rebranded from DeRo United Futbol Academy, named after former Canadian Toronto FC forward and attacking midfielder Dwayne De Rosario.

=== Toronto FC Club Structure ===
Toronto FC Club Structure
| Team | Level | Type | League | Head Coach | Assistant Coach(es) | Goalkeeper Coach |
|---|---|---|---|---|---|---|
| Toronto FC | Senior Team | Professional | Major League Soccer | Robin Fraser | Neil Emblen, Wolde Harris, Steven Beitashour, Jase Kim | Simon Eaddy |
| Toronto FC II | Reserve Team | Professional | MLS Next Pro | Gianni Cimini | Marco Casalinuovo, Arman Mohammadi | David Monsalve |
| Toronto FC III/Academy (U19) | Academy | Academy | League1 Ontario – Championship | Dino Lopez | Dejan Jakovic | Paolo Ceccarelli |
| Toronto FC U17 | Academy | Academy | MLS Next | Paolo Ceccarelli | Paul Stalteri, Taylor Lord | |
| Toronto FC U16 | Academy | Academy | Ontario Player Development League | Dejan Jakovic | David Ennis | |
| Toronto FC U15 | Academy | Academy | MLS Next | Taylor Lord | Lauren Kadet, Nikola Stakic, David Ennis, Arman Mohammadi | |
| Toronto FC U14 | Academy | Academy | Ontario Player Development League | Nemanja Jovanovic | Lauren Kadet | |
| TFC Juniors | Pre-Academy | Youth | Regional Camps | Multiple coaches throughout regional camps. | | |

Regional Partners Structure
| Affiliated Team | League | Club or Parent Team | League |
|---|---|---|---|
| Windsor TFC | Ontario Player Development League | Windsor City FC | Ontario Premier League 2 |
| London TFC | Ontario Player Development League | FC London | Ontario Premier League 2 |
| Hamilton TFC | Ontario Player Development League | Hamilton United | Ontario Premier League 2 |
| DeRo TFC | Ontario Player Development League | DeRo United Futbol Academy | None |
| Kitchener TFC | Western Regional Soccer League | Kitchener Soccer Club | None |
| Ottawa TFC | Ontario Carleton Soccer League | None | None |

== Broadcasting ==
Since the 2023 season, all live Toronto FC MLS matches stream on MLS Season Pass for Apple TV+ subscribers on the Apple TV app as part of the league's exclusive broadcast rights agreement with Apple Inc., with all matches available with English, French, and Spanish commentary options. Selected matches are televised in English by TSN and in French by RDS as part of a sub-licensing agreement with Bell Media. Since 2019, Canadian Championship matches are broadcast by OneSoccer.

From 2017 through 2022, all of Toronto FC's MLS matches were exclusively broadcast in English by TSN, holding both the rights to the team's "regional" package (despite this, all matches were carried nationally and not subject to blackout outside of Ontario) and the national English rights to Major League Soccer, with selected national matches simulcast by parent network CTV. Prior to 2017, Toronto FC games were broadcast by TSN and Sportsnet. Games that were not covered under national broadcast contracts with MLS or other competition organizers were divided evenly between the two broadcasters, pursuant to agreements between their parent companies (Bell Canada and Rogers Communications, respectively) in connection to their joint 2011 purchase of MLSE. Radio broadcasts are divided between TSN 1050 and Sportsnet 590.

In the team's inaugural season in 2007, broadcasting rights were split between CBC Sports, Sportsnet, and The Score, with CBC broadcasting games from 2007 to 2010.

== Honours ==
Domestic
| Competitions | Titles | Seasons | Runners-up |
| MLS Cup | 1 | 2017 | 2016, 2019 |
| Supporters' Shield | 1 | 2017 | 2020 |
| Eastern Conference (Playoff) | 3 | 2016, 2017, 2019 | – |
| Eastern Conference (Regular Season) | 1 | 2017 | 2020 |
| Canadian Championship | 8 | 2009, 2010, 2011, 2012, 2016, 2017, 2018, 2020 | 2008, 2014, 2019, 2021, 2022, 2024 |
International
| CONCACAF Champions League | 0 | – | 2018 |
| Campeones Cup | 0 | – | 2018 |

Notes

- record

== Record ==
=== Year-by-year ===
This is a partial list of the last five seasons completed by Toronto. For the full season-by-season history, see List of Toronto FC seasons.

| Season | League | | | | | | | | | | | Position | | Playoffs | CC | Continental / Other | | Average attendance | Top goalscorer(s) | |
| Season | Div | League | Pld | W | L | D | GF | GA | GD | Pts | PPG | Conf. | Overall | Playoffs | CC | Continental / Other | | Average attendance | Player(s) | Goals |
|---|---|---|---|---|---|---|---|---|---|---|---|---|---|---|---|---|---|---|---|---|
| 2022 | MLS | 1 | 34 | 9 | 18 | 7 | 47 | 66 | −17 | 34 | 1 | 13th | 27th | DNQ | RU | DNQ | | 25,423 | (Spain) Jesús Jiménez (Canada) Jonathan Osorio | 10 |
| 2023 | MLS | 1 | 34 | 4 | 20 | 10 | 26 | 59 | −33 | 22 | 0.65 | 15th | 29th | DNQ | QF | Leagues Cup | GS | 25,310 | (Italy) Federico Bernardeschi (Italy) Lorenzo Insigne (Canada) Deandre Kerr | 5 |
| 2024 | MLS | 1 | 34 | 11 | 19 | 4 | 40 | 61 | −21 | 37 | 1.09 | 11th | 22nd | DNQ | RU | Leagues Cup | Ro32 | 25,681 | (Germany) Prince Owusu | 12 |
| 2025 | MLS | 1 | 34 | 6 | 14 | 14 | 37 | 44 | −7 | 32 | 0.94 | 12th | 25th | DNQ | PR | DNQ | | 21,353 | (Canada) Theo Corbeanu | 7 |
| 2026 | MLS | 1 | 34 | 9 | 13 | 12 | 52 | 67 | −15 | 39 | 1.15 | 12th | 24th | DNQ | PR | DNQ | | 19,685 | (United States) Josh Sargent | 10 |

1. Average attendance include statistics from league matches only.
2. Top goalscorer(s) includes all goals scored in League, MLS Cup playoffs, Canadian Championship, Leagues Cup, MLS is Back Tournament, CONCACAF Champions Cup, FIFA Club World Cup, and other competitive continental matches.

=== International competitions ===
Toronto has qualified for the CONCACAF Champions Cup seven times and reached the final once, in 2018.

Scores and results list Toronto's goal tally first.

| Season | Competition | Round | Opponent | Home | Away | Aggregate |
|---|---|---|---|---|---|---|
| 2009–10 | CONCACAF Champions League | Preliminary round | Puerto Rico Islanders | 0–1 | 0–0 | 0–1 |
| 2010–11 | CONCACAF Champions League | Preliminary round | (Honduras) Motagua | 1–0 | 2–2 | 3–2 |
| 2010–11 | CONCACAF Champions League | Group stage | (Panama) Árabe Unido | 1–0 | 0–1 | 3rd |
| 2010–11 | CONCACAF Champions League | Group stage | (Mexico) Cruz Azul | 2–1 | 0–0 | 3rd |
| 2010–11 | CONCACAF Champions League | Group stage | (United States) Real Salt Lake | 1–1 | 1–4 | 3rd |
| 2011–12 | CONCACAF Champions League | Preliminary round | (Nicaragua) Real Estelí | 2–1 | 2–1 | 4–2 |
| 2011–12 | CONCACAF Champions League | Group stage | (United States) FC Dallas | 0–1 | 3–0 | 2nd |
| 2011–12 | CONCACAF Champions League | Group stage | (Panama) Tauro | 1–0 | 2–1 | 2nd |
| 2011–12 | CONCACAF Champions League | Group stage | (Mexico) UNAM | 1–1 | 0–4 | 2nd |
| 2011–12 | CONCACAF Champions League | Quarter-finals | (United States) LA Galaxy | 2–2 | 2–1 | 4–3 |
| 2011–12 | CONCACAF Champions League | Semi-finals | (Mexico) Santos Laguna | 1–1 | 2–6 | 3–7 |
| 2012–13 | CONCACAF Champions League | Group stage | (El Salvador) Águila | 5–1 | 3–0 | 2nd |
| 2012–13 | CONCACAF Champions League | Group stage | (Mexico) Santos Laguna | 1–3 | 0–1 | 2nd |
| 2018 | CONCACAF Champions League | Round of 16 | (United States) Colorado Rapids | 0–0 | 2–0 | 2–0 |
| 2018 | CONCACAF Champions League | Quarter-finals | (Mexico) UANL | 2–1 | 2–3 | 4–4 (a) |
| 2018 | CONCACAF Champions League | Semi-finals | (Mexico) América | 3–1 | 1–1 | 4–2 |
| 2018 | CONCACAF Champions League | Final | (Mexico) Guadalajara | 1–2 | 2–1 | 3–3 (2–4 p) |
| 2018 | Campeones Cup | Final | (Mexico) UANL | 1–3 | | |
| 2019 | CONCACAF Champions League | Round of 16 | (Panama) Independiente | 1–1 | 0–4 | 1–5 |
| 2021 | CONCACAF Champions League | Round of 16 | (Mexico) León | 2–1 | 1–1 | 3–2 |
| 2021 | CONCACAF Champions League | Quarter-finals | (Mexico) Cruz Azul | 1–3 | 0–1 | 1–4 |

=== Individual awards ===
==== MLS MVP ====
| Player | Season |
|---|---|
| (Italy) Sebastian Giovinco | 2015 |
| (Spain) Alejandro Pozuelo | 2020 |

==== MLS Golden Boot ====
| Player | Season | Goals |
|---|---|---|
| (Italy) Sebastian Giovinco | 2015 | 22 |

==== MLS Rookie of the Year ====
| Player | Season |
|---|---|
| (United States) Maurice Edu | 2007 |

==== MLS Newcomer of the Year ====
| Player | Season |
|---|---|
| (Italy) Sebastian Giovinco | 2015 |

==== MLS Coach of the Year ====
| Coach | Season |
|---|---|
| (United States) Greg Vanney | 2017 |

==== CONCACAF Coach of the Year ====
| Coach | Year |
|---|---|
| (United States) Greg Vanney | 2017 |

==== MLS Cup MVP ====
| Player | Season |
|---|---|
| (United States) Jozy Altidore | 2017 |

==== CONCACAF Champions League Golden Ball ====
| Player | Season |
|---|---|
| (Italy) Sebastian Giovinco | 2018 |

==== CONCACAF Champions League Golden Boot ====
| Player | Season |
|---|---|
| (Canada) Jonathan Osorio | 2018 |

== Attendance ==
Average attendance

| Season | Reg. season |
|---|---|
| 2007 | 20,134 |
| 2008 | 20,108 |
| 2009 | 20,344 |
| 2010 | 20,453 |
| 2011 | 20,267 |
| 2012 | 18,681 |
| 2013 | 18,131 |
| 2014 | 22,086 |
| 2015 | 23,451 |
| 2016 | 26,583 |
| 2017 | 27,647 |
| 2018 | 26,628 |
| 2019 | 25,048 |
| 2020 | 13,783 (Note: Due to the COVID-19 pandemic, the majority of matches were held behind closed doors. Only two Toronto FC "home" matches had fans in attendance – the season opener in Toronto with full attendance and the season finale in East Hartford, Connecticut, with limited capacity.) |
| 2021 | 7,898 (Note: Due to the COVID-19 pandemic, some games were played in a closed stadium in Florida, and later games were played at BMO Field with limited capacity.) |
| 2022 | 25,423 |
| 2023 | 25,310 |
| 2024 | 25,681 |
| 2025 | 21,353 |
| 2026 | 19,685 |

Attendance for Toronto FC dipped during 2012 and 2013 due to continued poor results by the team. Attendance bounced back in 2014 and in following years due in large part to the major signings of designated players such as Michael Bradley, Jermain Defoe and Sebastian Giovinco. Following consecutive seasons of poor results and the departures of Lorenzo Insigne and Federico Bernardeschi, Toronto FC experienced a notable decline in matchday attendance. The club averaged 21,353 supporters at BMO Field during the 2025 MLS season, marking its lowest full-season attendance figure outside of the COVID-19–impacted campaigns and a significant drop from the average recorded in 2024.

The largest attendance for a Toronto FC game at the team's home stadium, BMO Field, was on May 9, 2026, when they hosted Inter Miami CF in front of 44,828 attendees; the stadium was expanded beyond its capacity to accommodate the 2026 FIFA World Cup. The highest overall attendance for a home game was on March 7, 2012, when they hosted the Los Angeles Galaxy in the 2011–12 CONCACAF Champions League quarter-finals at the Rogers Centre in front of 47,658 attendees. The highest attendance for a friendly was 33,087 people at Rogers Centre on July 21, 2012 for a 1–1 draw against English side Liverpool.

== See also ==
- Canadian Championship
- Canada men's national soccer team
- Canadian Soccer Association
- Toronto Lynx
- Toronto Blizzard (1971–1984)
- Toronto Blizzard (1986–1993)
- Toronto Rockets
