= Earl Cochrane =

Canadian soccer executive

Personal information
- Full name: Earl Cochrane
- Position: Defender

College career
Years	Team	Apps	(Gls)
1989–1994	Carleton Ravens		

Senior career*
Years	Team	Apps	(Gls)
1996	Penang FA		
- * Club domestic league appearances and goals as of October 23, 2016 ‡ National team caps and goals as of March 6, 2016

Earl Cochrane is a Canadian soccer executive, who has previously worked for the Canadian Soccer Association, D.C. United, and Toronto FC.

== Playing career ==
Cochrane played university soccer at Carleton University. He was a four-time OUA All-star and a two time all-Canadian defender. Cochrane also played professionally in Asia.

== Management ==
Cochrane worked for the Canadian Soccer Association as the National Teams Manager from January 2001 before becoming Director of Communications in 2005. He was also Director of Communications of D.C. United for two years before returning to Canada. Cochrane was an original member of Toronto FC, joining in July 2006 as the club's Manager of Team Operations. Cochrane was named TFC Academy Director in April 2007. He was appointed interim general manager of Toronto FC on Sept 14, 2010, following Mo Johnston's removal. He became Director of Team and Player Operations following the appointment of Toronto FC's new management team in January, 2011. Shortly after the firing of general manager Kevin Payne, Cochrane was also fired.
