= Kobe Franklin =

Canadian soccer player (born 2003)

- Franklin with Toronto FC II in 2022

Personal information
- Full name: Kobe Lloyd Franklin
- Date of birth: May 10, 2003 (age 23)
- Place of birth: Toronto, Ontario, Canada
- Height: 5 ft 8 in (1.73 m)
- Position: Defender

Team information
- Current team: Toronto FC
- Number: 19

Youth career
- Beach Community Soccer
- Power Soccer
- Evanston SC
- 2012–2016: Chicago Fire FC
- 2017–2021: Toronto FC

Senior career*
Years	Team	Apps	(Gls)
2018	Toronto FC III	1	(1)
2021–2022	Toronto FC II	44	(4)
2022	→ Toronto FC (loan)	1	(0)
2023–	Toronto FC	83	(2)
2025	→ Toronto FC II (loan)	1	(0)

International career^{‡}
2019	Canada U17	2	(0)
2022	Canada U20	4	(0)
- * Club domestic league appearances and goals as of October 17, 2026 ‡ National team caps and goals as of June 26, 2022

Kobe Lloyd Franklin (born May 10, 2003) is a Canadian soccer player who plays as a defender for Toronto FC in Major League Soccer.

== Early life ==
Born in Toronto, Franklin began playing soccer at age four with Beach Community Soccer. Shortly after he began to play with Power Soccer Academy. When he was 9, his family moved to Chicago, where he began playing with Evanston SC before quickly joining the academy of Major League Soccer club Chicago Fire. He later returned to Toronto, joining the Toronto FC Academy in February 2017.During his time in Toronto, he attended St. Denis Catholic School and Neil McNeil Catholic High School.

== Club career ==
He made his senior debut playing for the Senior Academy team, Toronto FC III, on August 19, 2018, in League1 Ontario against Ottawa South United, scoring a 94th minute goal, becoming the youngest ever goal scorer in League1 Ontario at the age of 15 years, 3 months.

On May 13, 2021, he signed his first professional contract with Toronto FC II of USL League One to join the team for the 2021 season. He made his debut for Toronto FC II on May 22, 2021, against North Texas SC. He scored his first professional goal on August 18 against Forward Madison. On October 1, he recorded two assists and set up a third goal (although was not credited with a third assist) in a 3–0 victory over North Carolina FC. For the 2021 season, he was named a league First Team All-Star and was a finalist for both the USL League One Young Player of the Year and Defender of the Year awards. He was subsequently invited to training camp with the first team ahead of the 2022 season (and once again for the 2023 season).

On April 1, 2022, he joined the first team, Toronto FC on a short-term four-day loan. He signed additional four day loans on April 23, May 4, and May 7. He made his Major League Soccer debut on May 4, 2022, as a second-half substitute against FC Cincinnati. In February 2023, he signed a two-year homegrown player contract with two option years with Toronto FC. After a few substitute appearances, Franklin made his first start on April 29, 2023 against New York City FC. On August 4, 2024, he scored his first goal for the club, netting the winning goal, in a 2-1 victory over Mexican side Pachuca in the 2024 Leagues Cup. In 2025, he was loaned to the second team for some matches. On April 18, 2026, he scored his first MLS goal, scoring the game-tying goal in a 3-3 draw with Austin FC.

== International career ==
Franklin represented the Canada U17 team at the 2019 FIFA U-17 World Cup. In June 2022, he was named to the Canadian U-20 team for the 2022 CONCACAF U-20 Championship.

== Career statistics ==
As of match played October 17, 2026

Appearances and goals by club, season and competition
Club	Season	League			Playoffs		National cup		Continental		Other		Total	
Club	Season	Division	Apps	Goals	Apps	Goals	Apps	Goals	Apps	Goals	Apps	Goals	Apps	Goals
Toronto FC III	2018	League1 Ontario	1	1	—		—		—		0	0	1	1
Toronto FC II	2021	USL League One	24	2	—		—		—		—		24	2
Toronto FC II	2022	MLS Next Pro	20	2	2	0	—		—		—		22	2
Toronto FC II	Total		44	4	2	0	0	0	0	0	0	0	46	4
Toronto FC (loan)	2022	Major League Soccer	1	0	—		0	0	—		—		1	0
Toronto FC	2023	Major League Soccer	27	0	—		1	0	—		1 (Note: Appearance(s) in Leagues Cup)	0	29	0
Toronto FC	2024	Major League Soccer	21	0	—		5	0	—		2	1	28	1
Toronto FC	2025	Major League Soccer	15	0	—		1	0	—		—		16	0
Toronto FC	2026	Major League Soccer	20	2	—		1	0	—		—		21	2
Toronto FC	Total		84	2	0	0	8	0	0	0	3	1	95	3
Toronto FC II (loan)	2025	MLS Next Pro	1	0	—		—		—		—		1	0
Career total			130	7	2	0	8	0	0	0	3	1	143	8
