= Theo Corbeanu =

Canadian soccer player (born 2002)

Personal information
- Full name: Theodor Alexander Corbeanu
- Date of birth: May 17, 2002 (age 24)
- Place of birth: Hamilton, Ontario, Canada
- Height: 1.90 m (6 ft 3 in)
- Positions: Forward; winger

Team information
- Current team: Toronto FC
- Number: 7

Youth career
- Quinndale Youth Soccer
- Mount Hamilton SC
- Hamilton Sparta SC
- Saltfleet SC
- Givova Academy
- 2016–2018: Toronto FC
- 2018–2021: Wolverhampton Wanderers

Senior career*
Years	Team	Apps	(Gls)
2018	Toronto FC III	5	(2)
2021–2024	Wolverhampton Wanderers	1	(0)
2021–2022	→ Sheffield Wednesday (loan)	13	(2)
2022	→ Milton Keynes Dons (loan)	16	(1)
2022–2023	→ Blackpool (loan)	18	(3)
2023	→ Arminia Bielefeld (loan)	15	(0)
2023–2024	→ Grasshoppers (loan)	16	(1)
2024–2026	Granada	19	(1)
2025	→ Toronto FC (loan)	32	(6)
2026–	Toronto FC	21	(3)

International career^{‡}
2018	Romania U16	5	(2)
2018–2019	Romania U17	8	(0)
2021–	Canada	7	(2)
- * Club domestic league appearances and goals as of November 7, 2026 ‡ National team caps and goals as of September 27, 2022

Theodor Alexander Corbeanu (born May 17, 2002) is a Canadian professional soccer player who plays as a forward or a winger for Major League Soccer side Toronto FC and the Canada national team.

== Early life ==
Born in Hamilton, Ontario, Corbeanu began playing house league soccer at the age of five with local club Quinndale Youth Soccer as a goalkeeper, but soon switched to a forward role. At youth level, he later played for local clubs Mount Hamilton SC, Hamilton Sparta SC, Saltfleet SC and Givova Academy. In late 2016, after a successful trial, Corbeanu joined the academy of Toronto FC.

== Club career ==
=== Toronto FC ===
In 2018, he played for Toronto FC III in League1 Ontario. He scored two goals in a 6–1 victory over Toronto Skillz FC on May 21, 2018.

=== Wolverhampton Wanderers ===
Having left Toronto FC in August 2018, Corbeanu was unsuccessful in a trial for English club Leicester City, but was later offered a scholarship with the academy of Wolverhampton Wanderers, in which he represented the club's U16 and U18 sides. In the summer of 2019, he joined the first team on their pre-season trip in China, before joining the club's U23 development squad in 2020.

After playing nine games for the Wolves U23 team, in which he scored four goals, Corbeanu signed a professional contract with the first team in October 2020. He subsequently became a regular fixture on the Wolves bench, eventually making his Premier League debut appearance for the club on May 16, 2021, coming on as a second-half substitute in their game away to Tottenham Hotspur, which ended with a 2–0 defeat.

==== Loan to Sheffield Wednesday ====
On August 2, 2021, Corbeanu joined EFL League One club Sheffield Wednesday on a season-long loan. He made his Owls debut in a single-goal defeat at Morecambe on August 28. On November 2, Corbeanu scored his first senior professional goal, with the opener in a 3–0 victory over Sunderland.

==== Loan to Milton Keynes Dons ====
On January 6, 2022, Corbeanu was recalled from his loan early by Wolves and sent back out on loan to another League One club, Milton Keynes Dons, for the remainder of the 2021–22 season. He made his debut on January 11 in a 1–0 home win over rivals AFC Wimbledon, and four days later scored his first goal for the club in a 2–1 away win over Portsmouth. Corbeanu went on to make 17 appearances for MK Dons as the club secured a third-placed play-off finish.

==== Loan to Blackpool ====
On July 28, 2022, Corbeanu joined EFL Championship club Blackpool on loan for the duration of the 2022–23 season. He made his debut for the club the next day as second-half substitute in a single-goal victory over Reading at Bloomfield Road. On August 20, Corbeanu scored his first goal for Blackpool, netting their first in an eventual 3–3 draw against Burnley. On January 3, 2023, he was re-called by Wolves after suffering an ankle injury, ending his time at the club.

==== Loan to Arminia Bielefeld ====
On January 20, 2023, 2. Bundesliga side Arminia Bielefeld announced they had signed Corbeanu on a loan from Wolves for the remainder of the season.

==== Loan to Grasshopper Club Zürich ====
On 4 July 2023, he signed with Grasshopper Club Zürich in the Swiss Super League for a season long loan spell. He moves to the Swiss record champion with fellow Wolves loanee Nigel Lonwijk. He was selected in the starting lineup of the first game of the season on 22 July 2023 and supplied the assist for Grasshopper's only goal in a 1–3 home defeat to Servette FC.

His loan was cut short, following a change of ownership at Grasshoppers, and he returned to Wolves on 19 January 2024.

=== Granada CF ===
On February 1, 2024 Corbeanu signed with La Liga side Granada. He made his debut two days later against Las Palmas, entering the match as a substitute for Facundo Pellistri. He scored his first goal for his new club on March 3, netting a late consolation strike against Villarreal in a 5–1 defeat.

==== Return to Toronto FC (loan) ====
On January 14, 2025, Corbeanu returned to Toronto FC on a one-year loan deal.

== International career ==
After not being selected for the Canadian U15 team, Corbeanu contacted the Romanian federation, who were aware of his progress. He began playing for Romania at U16 and U17 level, scoring twice in his first match with the U16 side against the Republic of Ireland. After two years with the Romanian youth teams, he left in 2019, wanting to remain eligible for Canada at senior level.

He was called up to the Canadian senior team for the first time in December 2020, for a January training camp, but later withdrew due to club commitments with Wolves. He officially joined the senior squad for the first time in March 2021, when he was called up ahead of Canada's 2022 World Cup qualification matches against Bermuda and the Cayman Islands. He made his debut as a 77th-minute substitute against Bermuda on March 25, 2021, scoring four minutes into his debut with Canada's fifth goal in a 5–1 victory.

In June 2021, Corbeanu was named in Canada's preliminary squad for the 2021 CONCACAF Gold Cup. On July 1, 2021, he was named in the final squad that would participate at the tournament. In December 2021, Corbeanu was named the 2021 Canada Soccer Youth Player of the Year.

He was included in the preliminary squad for the 2023 CONCACAF Gold Cup, but did not make the final squad.

== Career statistics ==
=== Club ===
As of match played November 7, 2026

Appearances and goals by club, season and competition
Club	Season	League			National cup		League cup		Other		Total	
Club	Season	Division	Apps	Goals	Apps	Goals	Apps	Goals	Apps	Goals	Apps	Goals
Toronto FC III	2018	League1 Ontario	5	2	—		2 (Note: Appearances in League1 Ontario League Cup)	1	—		7	3
Wolverhampton Wanderers U21	2020–21	—			—		—		4 (Note: Appearances in EFL Trophy)	0	4	0
Wolverhampton Wanderers	2020–21	Premier League	1	0	0	0	0	0	—		1	0
Wolverhampton Wanderers	2021–22	Premier League	0	0	0	0	0	0	—		0	0
Wolverhampton Wanderers	Total		1	0	0	0	0	0	4	0	5	0
Sheffield Wednesday (loan)	2021–22	League One	13	2	2	0	0	0	3	0	18	2
Milton Keynes Dons (loan)	2021–22	League One	16	1	—		—		1 (Note: Appearance in League One play-offs)	0	17	1
Blackpool (loan)	2022–23	Championship	17	3	0	0	1	0	0	0	18	3
Arminia Bielefeld (loan)	2022–23	2. Bundesliga	13	0	0	0	0	0	2 (Note: Appearances in 2. Bundesliga relegation play-offs)	0	15	0
Grasshoppers (loan)	2023–24	Swiss Super League	16	1	2	0	—		—		18	1
Granada	2023–24	La Liga	9	1	—		—		—		9	1
Granada	2024–250	Segunda División	10	0	0	0	—		—		10	0
Granada	Total		19	1	0	0	—		—		19	1
Toronto FC (loan)	2025	MLS	32	6	1	1	—		—		33	7
Toronto FC	2026	MLS	21	3	0	0	—		—		21	3
Toronto FC	Toronto FC total		53	9	1	1	—		—		54	10
Career total			153	19	5	1	3	1	10	0	171	21

=== International ===
As of match played September 27, 2022

Appearances and goals by national team and year
National team	Year	Apps	Goals
Canada	2021	6	2
Canada	2022	1	0
Total		7	2

Scores and results list Canada's goal tally first, score column indicates score after each Corbeanu goal.

List of international goals scored by Theo Corbeanu
No.	Date	Venue	Opponent	Score	Result	Competition
1	March 25, 2021	Exploria Stadium, Orlando, United States	Bermuda	5–1	5–1	2022 FIFA World Cup qualification
2	July 11, 2021	Children's Mercy Park, Kansas City, United States	Martinique	4–1	4–1	2021 CONCACAF Gold Cup

== Honours ==
Individual

- Canada Soccer Youth Player of the Year: 2021
