= 2025 Toronto FC season =

Toronto FC 2025 soccer season

Toronto FC
2025 season
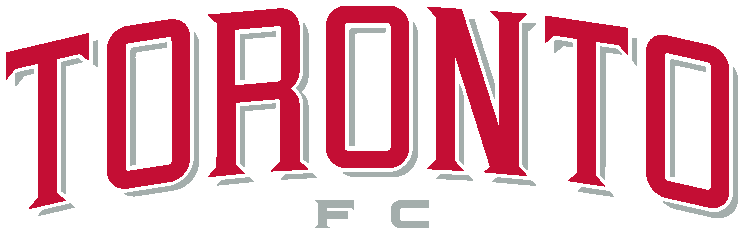
- Owner: Maple Leaf Sports & Entertainment
- President: Vacant
- Head coach: Robin Fraser
- Stadium: BMO Field
- Major League Soccer: Conference: 12th Overall: 25th
- MLS Cup playoffs: Did not qualify
- Canadian Championship: Preliminary round
- Top goalscorer: League: Theo Corbeanu (6); All: Theo Corbeanu (7)
- Average home league attendance: 21,353
- Biggest win: MTL 1–6 TOR (May 17)
- Biggest defeat: Two goals (Seven matches)
Home colours	Away colours

The 2025 Toronto FC season was the 19th season in the history of Toronto FC, and the first under the leadership of manager Robin Fraser.

== Squad ==
As of September 8, 2025

No.	Player	Nationality	Position(s)	Date of birth (age)	Signed in	Previous club
Goalkeepers
1	Sean Johnson	(United States)	GK	May 31, 1989 (aged 36)	2023	(United States) New York City FC
77	Adisa De Rosario	(Canada)	GK	October 27, 2004 (aged 21)	2025	(Canada) Toronto FC II
90	Luka Gavran	(Canada)	GK	May 9, 2000 (aged 25)	2023	(Canada) Toronto FC II
Defenders
5	Kevin Long	(Republic of Ireland)	CB	August 18, 1990 (aged 35)	2024	(England) Birmingham City
12	Zane Monlouis	(England)	CB	October 16, 2003 (aged 22)	2025	(England) Arsenal
15	Nicksoen Gomis	(France)	LB	March 15, 2002 (aged 23)	2024	(England) Sheffield United
17	Sigurd Rosted	(Norway)	CB	July 22, 1994 (aged 31)	2023	(Denmark) Brøndby
19	Kobe Franklin	(Canada)	RB	May 10, 2003 (aged 22)	2023	(Canada) Toronto FC II
22	Richie Laryea	(Canada)	RB	January 7, 1995 (aged 30)	2024	(England) Nottingham Forest
25	Nathaniel Edwards	(Canada)	LB	October 18, 2002 (aged 23)	2024	(Canada) Toronto FC II
28	Raoul Petretta	(Italy) (Germany)	LB	March 24, 1997 (aged 28)	2023	(Turkey) Kasımpaşa
30	Henry Wingo	(United States)	RB / CB	October 4, 1995 (aged 30)	2024	(Hungary) Ferencváros
30	Lazar Stefanovic	(Canada)	CB / CB	August 6, 2006 (aged 19)	2024	(Canada) Toronto FC II
Midfielders
8	José Cifuentes	(Ecuador) (Note: Cifuentes held a U.S. Green Card, so he counted as a domestic player for MLS purposes.)	CM	March 12, 1999 (aged 26)	2025 (loan)	(Scotland) Rangers
10	Djordje Mihailovic	(United States)	AM	September 10, 1998 (aged 27)	2025	(United States) Colorado Rapids
14	Alonso Coello	(Spain)	MF	October 12, 1999 (aged 26)	2023	(Canada) Toronto FC II
21	Jonathan Osorio	(Canada)	AM / CM	June 12, 1992 (aged 33)	2013	(Canada) SC Toronto
23	Maxime Dominguez	(Switzerland)	MF	February 1, 1996 (aged 29)	2025 (loan)	(Brazil) Vasco da Gama
47	Kosi Thompson	(Canada)	MF	January 27, 2003 (aged 22)	2022	(Canada) Toronto FC II
71	Markus Cimermancic	(Slovenia) (Canada)	MF	October 1, 2004 (aged 21)	2025	(Canada) Toronto FC II
78	Malik Henry	(Canada)	MF	July 23, 2002 (aged 23)	2025	(Canada) Toronto FC II
Forwards
7	Theo Corbeanu	(Canada)	FW	May 17, 2002 (aged 23)	2025 (loan)	(Spain) Granada
11	Derrick Etienne Jr.	(Haiti) (United States)	FW	November 25, 1996 (aged 29)	2024	(United States) Atlanta United FC
29	Deandre Kerr	(Canada)	FW	November 29, 2002 (aged 23)	2022	(United States) Syracuse Orange
99	Jules-Anthony Vilsaint	(Canada)	FW	January 6, 2003 (aged 22)	2025	(Canada) CF Montréal
Out on loan
—	Cassius Mailula (at Kortrijk)	(South Africa)	FW	June 12, 2001 (aged 24)	2023	(South Africa) Mamelodi Sundowns
51	Adam Pearlman (at HFX Wanderers FC)	(Canada) (South Africa)	CB	April 5, 2005 (aged 20)	2024	(Canada) Toronto FC II
18	Hugo Mbongue (at Vancouver FC)	(Canada)	FW	July 27, 2004 (aged 21)	2022	(Canada) Toronto FC II
38	Charlie Sharp (at Tampa Bay Rowdies)	(United States)	FW	June 23, 2001 (aged 24)	2024	(Canada) Toronto FC II

Players no longer on roster

No.	Player	Nationality	Position(s)	Date of birth (age)	Departure	Next club
74	Michael Sullivan	(United States)	MF	May 26, 2004 (aged 21)	Short-term loan	(Canada) Toronto FC II
75	Reid Fisher	(United States)	DF	March 3, 2003 (aged 22)	Short-term loan	(Canada) Toronto FC II
91	Dékwon Barrow	(Canada)	FW	January 16, 2004 (aged 21)	Short-term loan	(Canada) Toronto FC II
10	Federico Bernardeschi	(Italy)	MF	February 16, 1994 (aged 31)	Buyout	(Italy) Bologna
24	Lorenzo Insigne	(Italy)	MF	June 4, 1991 (aged 34)	Buyout	
16	Tyrese Spicer	(Trinidad and Tobago)	MF	December 4, 2000 (aged 24)	Traded	(United States) Orlando City SC
8	Matty Longstaff	(England)	MF	March 1, 2000 (aged 25)	Traded	(Canada) CF Montréal
20	Deiby Flores	(Honduras)	MF	June 16, 1996 (aged 29)	Transfer	(Saudi Arabia) Al-Najma
9	Ola Brynhildsen	(Norway)	FW	April 27, 1999 (aged 26)	Loan recall	(Norway) Bodø/Glimt

=== Roster slots ===
Toronto was initially allocated 8+3 international roster slots, two Designated Player slots, and four U22-initiative roster spots available for use in the 2025 season. Beginning in 2022, MLS added three non-tradeable international roster spots to the Canadian franchises to compensate for the more complicated residency requirements compared to in the United States; players occupying these additional roster spots were required to have played and been registered with a Canadian MLS club for at least one full year. In April 2024, Toronto acquired an additional international roster slot from Sporting Kansas City in exchange for $175,000 in GAM in 2025 and $100,000 in GAM in 2026, while adding another slot from Houston Dynamo FC in exchange for $200,000 in 2025 General Allocation Money and $100,000 in 2026 GAM. In summer 2025, they gave up one international slot to Sporting Kansas City in exchange for $50,000 in 2026 GAM, another international slot to the New York Red Bulls in exchange for $125,000 in 2025 GAM and $50,000 in 2026 GAM, and another four international slots to the Portland Timbers, Charlotte FC, and Inter Miami CF each in exchange for $175,000 in 2025 GAM. They also sent another slot to Chicago Fire FC in exchange for $100,000 in 2026 GAM.

International slots
Slot	Player	Nationality
E1	Raoul Petretta	Italy
E2	Alonso Coello	Spain
E3		
R1	Sigurd Rosted	Norway
R2	Kevin Long	Ireland
Kansas City	Maxime Dominguez	Switzerland
Houston		
R3	Traded to Sporting Kansas City	
R4	Traded to New York Red Bulls	
R5	Traded to Portland Timbers	
R6	Traded to Charlotte FC	
R7	Traded to Inter Miami CF	
R8	Traded to Chicago Fire FC	
Injured	Nicksoen Gomis	France
Injured	Zane Monlouis	England
Loaned Out	Cassius Mailula	South Africa

Designated Player slots
Slot	Player
1	(United States) Djordje Mihailovic
2	
Former	(Italy) Federico Bernardeschi
Former	(Italy) Lorenzo Insigne

U22 Initiative slots
Slot	Player
1	(South Africa) Cassius Mailula
2	
3	
4	

Season-ending injury list
Slot	Player
1	(France) Nicksoen Gomis
2	(England) Zane Monlouis
3	(United States) Henry Wingo

== Transfers ==
Note: All figures in United States dollars.

=== In ===
==== Transfers in ====
No.	Pos.	Player	From	Fee/notes	Date	Source
—	FW	(Brazil) Thiago Andrade	(United States) San Diego FC	Trade for 2025 SuperDraft 1st-round pick & $250,000 2025 conditional GAM	December 12, 2024	
77	GK	(Canada) Adisa De Rosario	(Canada) Toronto FC II	Home grown deal to 2026 with options for 2027 & 2028	February 7, 2025	
71	MF	(Canada) Markus Cimermancic	(Canada) Toronto FC II	Home grown deal to 2026 with options for 2027 & 2028	February 21, 2025	
12	DF	(England) Zane Monlouis	(England) Arsenal	Two year deal with options for 2027 & 2028	February 22, 2025	
76	DF	(Canada) Lazar Stefanovic	(Canada) Toronto FC II	Home grown deal to 2028 with option for 2029	February 26, 2025	
10	MF	(United States) Djordje Mihailovic	(United States) Colorado Rapids	$8,000,000 & up to $1,000,000 in conditional performance-based incentives	August 7, 2025	
78	MF	(Canada) Malik Henry	(Canada) Toronto FC II	Deal for 2025 with options for 2026 & 2027	August 9, 2025	
99	FW	(Canada) Jules-Anthony Vilsaint	(Canada) CF Montréal	Trade for Matty Longstaff	August 13, 2025	

==== Loans in ====
No.	Pos.	Player	From	Fee/notes	Date	Source
7	FW	(Canada) Theo Corbeanu	(Spain) Granada	Season-long loan to October 18, 2025 with an option to purchase	January 14, 2025	
9	FW	(Norway) Ola Brynhildsen	(Denmark) Midtjylland	Twelve month loan with purchase option after 2025 season	February 15, 2025	
75	DF	(United States) Reid Fisher	(Canada) Toronto FC II	Short-term loan (March 8, June 28, July 3)	March 8, 2025	
74	MF	(United States) Michael Sullivan	(Canada) Toronto FC II	Short-term loan (March 22, May 3, June 25, June 28)	March 22, 2025	
23	MF	(Switzerland) Maxime Dominguez	(Brazil) Vasco da Gama	Season-long loan to December 31, 2025 with an option to purchase	April 3, 2025	
91	FW	(Canada) Dékwon Barrow	(Canada) Toronto FC II	Short-term loan (April 30)	April 30, 2025	
78	MF	(Canada) Malik Henry	(Canada) Toronto FC II	Short-term loan (June 25, June 28, July 3)	June 25, 2025	
8	MF	(Ecuador) José Cifuentes	(Scotland) Rangers	Year-long loan to June 30, 2026 with an option to purchase	August 22, 2025	

==== MLS SuperDraft picks ====
2025 Toronto FC SuperDraft Picks
Round	Selection	Player	Position	College	Status
1	23	Reid Fisher	DF	San Diego State University	Signed with Toronto FC II
2	39	Michael Sullivan	MF	University of Pittsburgh	Signed with Toronto FC II
3	69	Joseph Melto Quiah	FW	University of Dayton	Signed with Toronto FC II

=== Out ===
==== Transfers out ====
No.	Pos.	Player	To	Fee/notes	Date	Source
6	DF	(Zambia) (United States) Aimé Mabika	(United States) Rhode Island FC	Option declined	October 28, 2024	
18	GK	(Trinidad and Tobago) Greg Ranjitsingh	(United States) New York City FC	Option declined	October 28, 2024	
23	MF	(United States) Brandon Servania	(United States) D.C. United	Option declined	October 28, 2024	
26	DF	(Trinidad and Tobago) (Canada) Luke Singh	(Canada) York United FC	Option declined	October 28, 2024	
27	DF	(United States) (Republic of Ireland) Shane O'Neill	(Serbia) Radnički 1923	Option declined	October 28, 2024	
99	FW	(Germany) Prince Owusu	(Canada) CF Montréal	Option declined	October 28, 2024	
—	FW	(Brazil) Thiago Andrade	(Japan) Cerezo Osaka	Transfer	January 13, 2025	
10	FW	(Italy) Federico Bernardeschi	(Italy) Bologna	Contract terminated	July 1, 2025	
24	FW	(Italy) Lorenzo Insigne	Unattached	Contract terminated	July 1, 2025	
16	FW	(Trinidad and Tobago) Tyrese Spicer	(United States) Orlando City SC	Traded for $225,000 in 2025 GAM, $275,000 in 2026 GAM, and $50,000 conditional GAM	August 1, 2025	
8	MF	(England) Matty Longstaff	(Canada) CF Montréal	Traded for Jules-Anthony Vilsaint, $225,000 in 2025 GAM, and $50,000 conditional 2026 GAM	August 13, 2025	
20	MF	(Honduras) Deiby Flores	(Saudi Arabia) Al-Najma	Transfer	August 20, 2025	
9	FW	(Norway) Ola Brynhildsen	(Denmark) Midtjylland	Loan terminated	September 2, 2025	

==== Loans out ====
No.	Pos.	Player	To	Fee/notes	Date	Source
—	FW	(South Africa) Cassius Mailula	(Morocco) Wydad AC	Loan until July 31, 2025 with option to buy	August 21, 2024	
51	DF	(Canada) (South Africa) Adam Pearlman	(Canada) HFX Wanderers FC	Season-long loan	February 24, 2025	
18	FW	(Canada) Hugo Mbongue	(United States) Lexington SC	Season-long loan (recalled early)	March 29, 2025	
18	FW	(Canada) Hugo Mbongue	(Canada) Vancouver FC	Season-long loan	July 23, 2025	
38	FW	(United States) Charlie Sharp	(United States) Tampa Bay Rowdies	Season-long loan	August 8, 2025	
	FW	(South Africa) Cassius Mailula	(Belgium) Kortrijk	Loan until June 30, 2026 with option to buy	September 8, 2025	

== Pre-season ==
=== Matches ===
January 30 Friendly	Fredrikstad FK	1–1	Toronto FC	Marbella, Spain
9:00 AM	Traoré 119'	Report	Corbeanu 47'	Stadium: Marbella Football Center
Note: Played in four 30-minute quarters.

February 3 Friendly	BK Häcken	Cancelled	Toronto FC	Marbella, Spain
		Report		Stadium: Marbella Football Center

February 11 Friendly	Toronto FC	0–1	Columbus Crew	Santa Barbara, California
2:00 PM		Report	Goal

February 14 Friendly	Real Salt Lake	1–1	Toronto FC	Santa Barbara, California
	Goal	Report	Bernardeschi

February 17 Friendly	Los Angeles FC	1–0	Toronto FC	Los Angeles, California
	Bouanga	Report		Stadium: LA Pecrformance Centre at Cal State LA

== Competitions ==
=== Major League Soccer ===
==== League tables ====
Eastern Conference

MLS Eastern Conference table (2025)
Pos	Team	Pld	Pts
10	New York Red Bulls	34	43
11	New England Revolution	34	36
12	Toronto FC	34	32
13	CF Montréal	34	28
14	Atlanta United FC	34	28

Source: MLS

Overall

Overall MLS standings table (2025)
Pos	Team	Pld	Pts
23	New England Revolution	34	36
24	St. Louis City SC	34	32
25	Toronto FC	34	32
26	LA Galaxy	34	30
27	Sporting Kansas City	34	28

Source: MLS

==== Matches ====
February 22 1	D.C. United	2–2	Toronto FC	Washington, D.C.
7:30 PM	Enow 8'; Benteke 35', (yellow card) 90+4'; Rowles (yellow card) 90+2'	Report	Long (yellow card) 17'; Osorio 28'; Rosted (yellow card) 60'; Bernardeschi 70' (pen.); Flores (yellow card) 78'	Stadium: Audi Field; Attendance: 16,655; Referee: Serhiy Boyko

March 1 2	Orlando City SC	4–2	Toronto FC	Orlando, Florida
7:30 PM	Araújo 33'; Freeman 35'; Santos (yellow card) 57'; Ojeda 63'; Atuesta (yellow card) 73'; Thorhallsson 81'	Report	Rosted 72'; Flores 86'	Stadium: Inter&Co Stadium; Attendance: 18,582; Referee: Alexis Da Silva

March 8 3	FC Cincinnati	2–0	Toronto FC	Cincinnati, Ohio
7:30 PM	Evander (yellow card) 66'; Denkey 73' (pen.); Kubo 88'; Powell (yellow card) 89'	Report	Thompson (yellow card) 50'	Stadium: TQL Stadium; Attendance: 23,088; Referee: Ismir Pekmic

March 15 4	Toronto FC	1–2	Chicago Fire FC	Toronto, Ontario
2:30 PM	Kerr 11'	Report	Gutman 30'; Cuypers 44'	Stadium: BMO Field; Attendance: 22,738; Referee: Allen Chapman

March 22 5	New York Red Bulls	2–1	Toronto FC	Harrison, New Jersey
7:30 PM	Forsberg 44' (pen.), 76'; Ngoma (yellow card) 73'; Carballo (yellow card) 90+2' (yellow-red card) 90+3'	Report	Longstaff (yellow card) 24'; Petretta (yellow card) 45+4'; Bernardeschi (yellow card) 45+4'; Kerr 70'; Etienne (yellow card) 73'	Stadium: Sports Illustrated Stadium; Attendance: 18,185; Referee: Jon Freemon

March 29 6	Toronto FC	0–0	Vancouver Whitecaps FC	Toronto, Ontario
2:30 PM	Bernardeschi (yellow card) 65'	Report	Ocampo (yellow card) 81'	Stadium: BMO Field; Attendance: 22,301; Referee: Lukasz Szpala

April 6 7	Inter Miami CF	1–1	Toronto FC	Fort Lauderdale, Florida
7:00 PM	Segovia (yellow card) 45+1'; Messi 45+5'	Report	Thompson (yellow card) 18'; Bernardeschi 45+2'	Stadium: Chase Stadium; Attendance: 20,220; Referee: Rubiel Vazquez

April 12 8	Toronto FC	0–0	Minnesota United FC	Toronto, Ontario
2:30 PM	Insigne (yellow card) 32'	Report	Hlongwane (yellow card) 17'; Díaz (yellow card) 84'	Stadium: BMO Field; Attendance: 22,149; Referee: Malik Badawi

April 19 9	Real Salt Lake	0–1	Toronto FC	Sandy, Utah
9:30 PM	Luna (red card) 61'; Eneli (yellow card) 67'; Glad (yellow card) 90+5'	Report	Corbeanu 9'; Flores (yellow card) 12'; Bernardeschi (yellow card) 36'; Petretta (yellow card) 62'; Johnson (yellow card) 73'; Thompson (yellow card) 84'	Stadium: America First Field; Attendance: 19,802; Referee: Sergii Demianchuk

April 26 10	Toronto FC	0–1	New York City FC	Toronto, Ontario
2:30 PM	Flores (yellow card) 21'; Long (yellow card) 31'	Report	O'Toole (yellow card) 22'; Martínez 64' (pen.); Fernández (yellow card) 71'; Gray (yellow card) 90+7'	Stadium: BMO Field; Attendance: 22,699; Referee: Pierre-Luc Lauzière

May 3 11	Toronto FC	0–2	New England Revolution	Toronto, Ontario
4:30 PM		Report	Gil 11'; Campana (yellow card) 26', (goal) 27'	Stadium: BMO Field; Attendance: 19,690; Referee: Tori Penso

May 10 12	Toronto FC	2–0	D.C. United	Toronto, Ontario
4:30 PM	Insigne 49'; Bartlett 66' (o.g.); Dominguez (yellow card) 90+1'	Report		Stadium: BMO Field; Attendance: 20,236; Referee: Marcos de Oliveira

May 14 13	Toronto FC	0–1	FC Cincinnati	Toronto, Ontario
7:30 PM	Bernardeschi (yellow card) 19'	Report	Denkey 18'; Flores (yellow card) 24'; Evander (yellow card) 32'; Engel (yellow card) 90'	Stadium: BMO Field; Attendance: 14,018; Referee: Jair Marrufo

May 17 14	CF Montréal	1–6	Toronto FC	Montreal, Quebec
2:30 PM	Waterman (red card) 21'; Álvarez (yellow card) 45+4'; Neal (yellow card) 57'; Vrioni 64'; Sealy (yellow card) 88'	Report	Thompson (yellow card) 9'; Spicer 14'; Bernardeschi 30', 55'; Brynhildsen 33'; Corbeanu 66', 90+1'	Stadium: Saputo Stadium; Attendance: 16,008; Referee: Filip Dujic

May 24 15	Toronto FC	1–2	Nashville SC	Toronto, Ontario
7:30 PM	Bernardeschi (yellow card) 86'; Osorio 90+1'; Thompson (yellow card) 90+2'	Report	Surridge 57', 89'	Stadium: BMO Field; Attendance: 19,504; Referee: Armando Villarreal

May 28 16	Toronto FC	1–2	Philadelphia Union	Toronto, Ontario
7:30 PM	Brynhildsen 75'	Report	Harriel 86'; Baribo (yellow card) 89'; Wagner 90+2'; Bedoya (yellow card) 90+7'	Stadium: BMO Field; Attendance: 14,490; Referee: Guido Gonzales Jr.

May 31 17	Toronto FC	0–2	Charlotte FC	Toronto, Ontario
7:30 PM	Flores (yellow card) 37'; Osorio (yellow card) 80'; Laryea (yellow card) 86'; Petretta (yellow card) 90+2'	Report	Biel 56'; Agyemang 90', (yellow card) 90+1'	Stadium: BMO Field; Attendance: 19,406; Referee: Joe Dickerson

June 25 19	Toronto FC	1–1	New York Red Bulls	Toronto, Ontario
7:30 PM	Corbeanu 51'; Coello (yellow card) 66'	Report	Sofo 20', (yellow card) 80'	Stadium: BMO Field; Attendance: 19,826; Referee: Filip Dujic

June 28 20	Toronto FC	3–0	Portland Timbers	Toronto, Ontario
7:30 PM	Coello 11'; Spicer 56'; Smith 90+4' (o.g.); Thompson (yellow card) 90+5'	Report	Župarić (yellow card) 43'; Fory (yellow card) 68'; Ayala (yellow card) 77'; Kelsy (yellow card) 90'	Stadium: BMO Field; Attendance: 22,445; Referee: Rosendo Mendoza

July 3 21	New York City FC	3–1	Toronto FC	New York City, New York
7:30 PM	Wolf 20'; Martínez (yellow card) 25'; Ilenič 49'; O'Toole 74'	Report	Long (yellow card) 2'; Longstaff (yellow card) 19'; Dominguez (yellow card) 67'; Romero 70' (o.g.); Henry (yellow card) 71'	Stadium: Yankee Stadium; Attendance: 19,395; Referee: Fotis Bazakos

July 12 22	Toronto FC	1–1	Atlanta United FC	Toronto, Ontario
7:30 PM	Flores (yellow card) 45+6', (goal) 48'; Rosted (yellow card) 63'; Spicer (yellow card) 82'; Petretta (yellow card) 88'; Longstaff (yellow card) 90+12'	Report	Thiaré (yellow card) 90+9'; Latte Lath 90+11' (pen.)	Stadium: BMO Field; Attendance: 23,100; Referee: Jon Freemon

July 16 23	San Diego FC	0–1	Toronto FC	San Diego, California
10:30 PM	De la Torre (yellow card) 40'; Valakari (yellow card) 45'; Bombino (yellow card) 65'; Pilcher (yellow card) 90'; Boateng (yellow card) 90+2'	Report	Corbeanu 20' (pen.), (yellow card) 45+3'; Coello (yellow card) 90+4'; Long (yellow card) 90+5'	Stadium: Snapdragon Stadium; Attendance: 23,514; Referee: Alyssa Pennington

July 19 24	Nashville SC	1–0	Toronto FC	Nashville, Tennessee
8:30 PM	Surridge 28'; Zimmerman (yellow card) 60'; Muyl (yellow card) 68'; Mukhtar (yellow card) 80'	Report	Franklin (yellow card) 68'; Long (yellow card) 73'	Stadium: Geodis Park; Attendance: 28,786; Referee: Serhiy Boyko

July 26 25	Charlotte FC	2–0	Toronto FC	Charlotte, North Carolina
7:30 PM	Toklomati 60'; Vargas 65'; Westwood (yellow card) 68'	Report	Dominguez (yellow card) 39'	Stadium: Bank of America Stadium; Attendance: 27,835; Referee: Jair Marrufo

August 9 26	Philadelphia Union	1–1	Toronto FC	Chester, Pennsylvania
7:30 PM	Vassilev 4'; Glesnes (yellow card) 29'; Wagner (yellow card) 63'; Makyanhya (yellow card) 79'	Report	Petretta (yellow card) 55'; Kerr (yellow card) 79', (goal) 90+1'; Thompson (yellow card) 90+10'	Stadium: Subaru Park; Attendance: 18,619; Referee: Tori Penso

August 16 27	Toronto FC	1–1	Columbus Crew	Toronto, Ontario
7:30 PM	Vilsaint 77'	Report	Rossi 8', (yellow card) 68'	Stadium: BMO Field; Attendance: 23,452; Referee: Chris Penso

August 24 28	Atlanta United FC	0–0	Toronto FC	Atlanta, Georgia
5:00 PM	Alzate (yellow card) 65'; Slisz (yellow card) 70'; Almirón (yellow card) 82'	Report	Coello (yellow card) 84'	Stadium: Mercedes-Benz Stadium; Attendance: 39,509; Referee: Lorenzo Hernandez

August 30 29	Toronto FC	1–1	CF Montréal	Toronto, Ontario
7:30 PM	Dominguez (yellow card) 36'; Long (yellow card) 50'; Vilsaint (yellow card) 86'; Osorio 89'	Report	Synchuk (yellow card) 10'; Petrasso (yellow card) 32'; Owusu (yellow card) 40'; Sealy 84'; Gillier (yellow card) 87'	Stadium: BMO Field; Attendance: 27,076; Referee: Drew Fischer

September 13 30	New England Revolution	1–1	Toronto FC	Foxborough, Massachusetts
7:30 PM	Oyirwoth (yellow card) 38'; Chancalay (yellow card) 42'; Fofana (yellow card) 67'; Langoni 90'; Yusuf (yellow card) 90+6'	Report	Franklin (yellow card) 19'; Corbeanu 75'; Dominguez (yellow card) 76'; Laryea (yellow card) 80'	Stadium: Gillette Stadium; Attendance: 22,391; Referee: Alexis Da Silva

September 20 31	Columbus Crew	1–1	Toronto FC	Columbus, Ohio
7:30 PM	Abou Ali 16'; Gazdag (yellow card) 42'; Aliyu (yellow card) 90+8'	Report	Coello (yellow card) 34'; Laryea 51'	Stadium: Lower.com Field; Attendance: 20,739; Referee: Elijio Arreguin

September 27 32	Toronto FC	1–1	Inter Miami CF	Toronto, Ontario
4:30 PM	Mihailovic 60', (yellow card) 80'; Petretta (yellow card) 82'	Report	Suárez (yellow card) 45'; Allende 45+1'	Stadium: BMO Field; Attendance: 28,855; Referee: Pierre-Luc Lauzière

October 4 33	Chicago Fire FC	2–2	Toronto FC	Chicago, Illinois
8:30 PM	Zinckernagel (yellow card) 21'; Elliott 71', 89'; Waterman (yellow card) 90+11'	Report	Elliott 27' (o.g.); Laryea (yellow card) 74'; Mihailovic (yellow card) 90', (penalty missed) 90+10', 90+10'	Stadium: Soldier Field; Attendance: 24,653; Referee: Tim Ford

October 8 18	Los Angeles FC	2–0	Toronto FC	Los Angeles, California
10:30 PM	Ebobisse 13'; Delgado (yellow card) 17'; Martínez (penalty missed) 60'; Amaya 69'	Report	Thompson (yellow card) 58'; Coello (red card) 90+9'	Stadium: BMO Stadium; Attendance: 22,020; Referee: Filip Dujic
Note: Match moved from June 13 due to Los Angeles FC's participation in the 2025 FIFA Club World Cup.

October 18 34	Toronto FC	4–2	Orlando City SC	Toronto, Ontario
6:00 PM	Osorio 7'; Mihailovic 34', 48'; Etienne (yellow card) 46'; Corbeanu (yellow card) 49'; Laryea (yellow card) 56'; Kerr 61'; Henry (yellow card) 90'	Report	Marín (yellow card) 32'; Brekalo 54'; McGuire 90+2', (yellow card) 90+5'	Stadium: BMO Field; Attendance: 21,013; Referee: Fotis Bazakos

=== Canadian Championship ===
April 30 Preliminary round	Toronto FC	2–2 (2–3 p)	CF Montréal	Toronto, Ontario
7:00 PM	Corbeanu 30'; Coello (yellow card) 38'; Gomis (yellow card) 45+3'; Spicer 74'; Dominguez (yellow card) 79'	Report	Loturi (yellow card) 43'; Waterman 70'; Vrioni 89'	Stadium: BMO Field; Attendance: 20,265; Referee: Michael Venne
	Penalties
	Spicer (penalty missed); Franklin (penalty scored); Coello (penalty scored); Corbeanu (penalty missed); Brynhildsen (penalty missed)		(penalty scored) Waterman; (penalty scored) Sealy; (penalty scored) Iankov; (penalty missed) Pearce

=== Leagues Cup ===
Toronto FC did not qualify for the 2025 Leagues Cup as they were not one of the top 9 teams in the Eastern Conference.

=== Competitions summary ===
Competition	Record								First Match	Last Match	Final Position
Competition	G	W	D	L	GF	GA	GD	Win %	First Match	Last Match	Final Position
MLS Regular Season	34	6	14	14	37	44	−7	17.65	February 22	October 18	12th in Eastern Conference, 25th Overall
Canadian Championship	1	0	1	0	2	2	+0	0.00	April 30		Preliminary round
Total	35	6	15	14	39	46	−7	17.14			

Source: Competitions

== Statistics ==
=== Goals ===
Rank	Nation	Player	Major League Soccer	Canadian Championship	Total
Totals			0	0	0

Source: Toronto FC

Left team during the season
Out on loan for remainder of the season

=== Shutouts ===
Rank	Nation	Player	Major League Soccer	Canadian Championship	Total
Totals			0	0	0

Source: Toronto FC

== Honours ==
=== MLS Team of the Matchday ===
Matchday (Note: Matchday listed refers to Toronto FC's matchday number, not the league-wide number)	Starters	Bench	Coach	Ref.
7	(Italy) Federico Bernardeschi	—	—	
9	(United States) Sean Johnson	—	—	
12	(United States) Sean Johnson	(Italy) Lorenzo Insigne	—	
14	(Italy) Federico Bernardeschi (Canada) Theo Corbeanu	(Norway) Ola Brynhildsen	—	
19	—	(United States) Sean Johnson	—	
20	—	(Spain) Alonso Coello	—	
23	—	(Canada) Theo Corbeanu	—	
26	—	(Canada) Deandre Kerr	—	

=== MLS Goal of the Matchday ===
Matchday	Player	Opponent	Ref.

=== MLS Player of the Matchday ===
Matchday	Player	Opponent	Ref.
