= Alonso Coello (footballer) =

Spanish footballer (born 1999)

- Coello with Toronto FC II in 2022

Personal information
- Full name: Alonso Coello Camarero
- Date of birth: 12 October 1999 (age 27)
- Place of birth: Madrid, Spain
- Height: 6 ft 1 in (1.85 m)
- Position: Midfielder

Team information
- Current team: Toronto FC
- Number: 14

Youth career
- Madrid Sur de Vallecas
- Atlético Madrid
- Rayo Vallecano

College career
Years	Team	Apps	(Gls)
2018–2021	Florida Atlantic Owls	60	(3)

Senior career*
Years	Team	Apps	(Gls)
2019	Dalton Red Wolves SC	9	(0)
2022–2023	Toronto FC II	23	(1)
2023	→ Toronto FC (loan)	2	(0)
2023–	Toronto FC	107	(2)
2024	→ Toronto FC II (loan)	1	(0)
- * Club domestic league appearances and goals as of 1 November 2026

Alonso Coello Camarero (born 12 October 1999) is a Spanish professional footballer who plays for Toronto FC in Major League Soccer.

== Early life ==
Born in Madrid, Spain, Coello began playing football at age four with Madrid Sur de Vallecas, eventually moving onto the Atlético Madrid youth system, when he was six, where he played for five years. Afterwards, he joined the youth system of Rayo Vallecano, where he played until the age of 18. With the Rayo Vallecano Juvenil, he won the Copa Federación Nacional Juvenil.

== College career ==
In 2018, Coello moved to the United States to attend Florida Atlantic University, where he played for the men's soccer team, joining through the La Liga ProPlayer initiative, a program that allows players from academy teams in Spain, between the ages 16 and 22, to go to the United States to play college soccer, where they can earn a university degree concurrently. At FAU, he studied economics. He scored his first goal on 19 October 2018, on a free kick, against the FIU Panthers. During his freshman season, he led the team with four assists and was named to the C-USA All-Conference Third Team and the C-USA All-Freshman Team. As a sophomore, he became FAU's first-ever player to earn C-USA First Team honors. In his junior year, he was named to the All-C-USA Second Team. In his senior year in 2021, he was named to the All-C-USA Second Team, All-C-USA Tournament Team, and United Soccer Coaches All-Southeast Region Third Team, as FAU reached the C-USA finals for the first time in program history. He served as a team captain from 2019 to 2021.

== Club career ==
In 2019, Coello played with the Dalton Red Wolves in USL League Two. In 2020, he was set to join the Portland Timbers U23 in USL2, however, the season was cancelled due to the COVID-19 pandemic.

In 2022, Coello signed a professional contract with Toronto FC II in MLS Next Pro. He made his debut on April 3 against FC Cincinnati 2. He scored his first professional goal on 8 May, converting a penalty kick against New York City FC II. He served as team captain and played a team-high 2,189 minutes in 25 appearances.

In March 2023, Coello joined the Toronto FC first team on a short-term four day loan ahead of the team's match against the San Jose Earthquakes. He made his Major League Soccer debut on 25 March, starting the match against San Jose, playing the full 90 minutes. He signed a second short-term loan for the following match, as well. In April 2023, he was signed to a permanent contract with the first team for the 2023 season, with club options for 2024 and 2025, after having played the maximum number of two games under MLS short-term loan agreements. He made 21 league appearances in his rookie season, including 17 starts. On 19 June 2024, he scored his first MLS goal in a match against Nashville SC. In September 2024, he was briefly loaned to the second team, following his return from injury. In January 2025, he signed a three year extension with the club through 2027, with an option for 2028.

== Career statistics ==
As of match played 1 November 2026

Appearances and goals by club, season and competition
Club	Season	League			Playoffs		National cup		Continental		Other		Total	
Club	Season	Division	Apps	Goals	Apps	Goals	Apps	Goals	Apps	Goals	Apps	Goals	Apps	Goals
Dalton Red Wolves SC	2019	USL League Two	9	0	—		0	0	—		—		9	0
Toronto FC II	2022	MLS Next Pro	23	1	2	0	—		—		—		25	1
Toronto FC (loan)	2023	Major League Soccer	2	0	—		—		—		—		2	0
Toronto FC	2023	Major League Soccer	19	0	—		1	0	—		2 (Note: Appearances in Leagues Cup)	0	22	0
Toronto FC	2024	Major League Soccer	25	1	—		4	0	—		0	0	29	1
Toronto FC	2025	Major League Soccer	31	1	—		1	0	—		—		32	1
Toronto FC	2026	Major League Soccer	32	0	—		1	0	—		—		33	0
Toronto FC	Total		109	2	—		7	0	—		2	0	118	2
Toronto FC II (loan)	2024	MLS Next Pro	1	0	—		—		—		—		1	0
Career total			142	3	2	0	7	0	0	0	2	0	153	3
