= 2023 Toronto FC II season =

Toronto FC II
2023 season
- Owner: Maple Leaf Sports & Entertainment
- Manager: Gianni Cimini
- MLS Next Pro: 11th (East); 23rd (overall)
- MLSNP Cup Playoffs: did not qualify
- Top goalscorer: Jesús Batiz (8 goals)

The 2023 Toronto FC II season is the eighth season of play in the club's history and their second season in MLS Next Pro.

== Team roster ==
MLS Next Pro allows for up to 35 players on a roster. Roster slots 1 through 24 are reserved for players on professional contracts. The remaining 11 slots are for amateur MLS Academy players (who are unpaid, must be under the age of 21, be part of the team's academy, and have never signed a professional contract or played in the NCAA).

As of September 24, 2023

No.	Pos.	Nation	Player
33	FW	CAN	Reshaun Walkes
38	DF	CAN	Jalen Watson (loaned out)
40	GK	CAN	Adisa De Rosario
49	GK	CAN	Baj Maan
50	GK	CAN	Gianluca Catalano
51	DF	RSA	Adam Pearlman
54	DF	CAN	Kelsey Egwu
55	MF	CAN	Tyler Londono
60	GK	CAN	Nathaniel Abraham
62	DF	CAN	Rohan Goulbourne
63	DF	CAN	Joseph Daher
65	DF	CAN	Antony Curic
67	DF	CAN	James Fidalgo
68	MF	CAN	Lucas Olguin
70	MF	CAN	Matthew Catavolo
71	MF	CAN	Markus Cimermancic
72	MF	CAN	Jordan Faria
73	FW	HON	Jesús Batiz
74	DF	CAN	Kundai Mawoko
75	MF	CAN	Luca Accettola
76	DF	CAN	Lazar Stefanovic
78	DF	CAN	Adamo Pantaleo
82	MF	CAN	Julian Altobelli
85	MF	CAN	Marko Stojadinovic
86	FW	PUR	Alec Díaz
87	DF	CAN	Chimere Omeze
89	DF	CAN	Matthew Medeiros
91	FW	CAN	Dékwon Barrow
92	MF	CAN	Theo Rigopoulos
93	MF	CAN	Ethan Kang
94	FW	CAN	Myles Morgan
95	MF	CAN	Ife Adenuga
98	DF	CAN	Jovan Ivanisevic

Toronto FC Academy player

First team players who have been loaned to TFC II in 2023
No.	Position	Nation	Player
3	DF	CAN	Cristián Gutiérrez
7	DF	CAN	Jahkeele Marshall-Rutty
11	MF	GHA	Latif Blessing
18	GK	TRI	Greg Ranjitsingh
20	FW	CAN	Ayo Akinola
30	GK	SLV	Tomas Romero
47	MF	CAN	Kosi Thompson
77	FW	CAN	Jordan Perruzza
81	MF	CAN	Themi Antonoglou
83	FW	CAN	Hugo Mbongue
90	GK	CAN	Luka Gavran

Has since been loaned to another club and is no longer eligible

== Coaching staff ==
As of November 15, 2022

Coaching staff
Head coach	(Canada) Gianni Cimini
Assistant coach	(Canada) Marco Casalinuovo
Assistant coach	(Canada) Yianni Michelis
Goalkeeping coach	(Canada) David Monsalve

== Transfers ==
Note: All figures in United States dollars.

=== In ===
==== Transferred In ====
No.	Pos.	Player	From	Fee/notes	Date	Source
38	DF	(Canada) Jalen Watson	(United States) Penn State Nittany Lions	Toronto FC draft pick, Signed to second team	March 17, 2023	
73	FW	(Honduras) Jesus Batiz	(United States) Rochester New York FC		March 21, 2023	
70	MF	(Canada) Matthew Catavolo	(Canada) Valour FC	Undisclosed fee	March 21, 2023	
72	MF	(Canada) Jordan Faria	(Finland) MuSa		March 22, 2023	
95	MF	(Canada) Ife Adenuga	(Canada) Sigma FC	Short-term contract with extension option	June 3, 2023	
50	GK	(Canada) Gianluca Catalano	(Canada) Vaughan Azzurri	Short-term contract with extension option	June 23, 2023	
49	GK	(Canada) Baj Maan	(Canada) Simcoe County Rovers FC	Short-term contract	September 22, 2023	
54	DF	(Canada) Kelsey Egwu	(Canada) FC London	Short-term contract	September 24, 2023	

==== Loaned in ====
No.	Pos.	Player	From	Fee/notes	Date	Source
81	MF	(Canada) Themi Antonoglou	(Canada) Toronto FC	Loan from first team	March 31, 2023	
83	FW	(Canada) Hugo Mbongue	(Canada) Toronto FC	Loan from first team	April 14, 2023	
30	GK	(El Salvador) Tomás Romero	(Canada) Toronto FC	Loan from first team	April 23, 2023	
47	MF	(Canada) Kosi Thompson	(Canada) Toronto FC	Loan from first team	April 23, 2023	
3	DF	(Canada) Cristián Gutiérrez	(Canada) Toronto FC	Loan from first team	May 14, 2023	
18	GK	(Trinidad and Tobago) Greg Ranjitsingh	(Canada) Toronto FC	Loan from first team	June 11, 2023	
7	MF	(Canada) Jahkeele Marshall-Rutty	(Canada) Toronto FC	Loan from first team	June 15, 2023	
20	FW	(Canada) Ayo Akinola	(Canada) Toronto FC	Loan from first team	June 15, 2023	
77	FW	(Canada) Jordan Perruzza	(Canada) Toronto FC	Loan from first team	July 12, 2023	
11	MF	(Ghana) Latif Blessing	(Canada) Toronto FC	Loan from first team	September 1, 2023	
90	GK	(Canada) Luka Gavran	(Canada) Toronto FC	Loan from first team	September 8, 2023	

=== Out ===
==== Transferred out ====
No.	Pos.	Player	To	Fee/notes	Date	Source
34	DF	(Canada) Klaidi Cela	(Canada) Vaughan Azzurri	Option declined	November 15, 2022	
85	MF	(Canada) Antonio Carlini		Option declined	November 15, 2022	
64	MF	(Japan) Kota Sakurai		Option declined	November 15, 2022	
68	MF	(Canada) Nakye Greenidge-Duncan	(United States) New England Revolution II	Option declined	November 15, 2022	
73	FW	(Canada) Stefan Karajovanovic	(New Zealand) Napier City Rovers	Option declined	November 15, 2022	
60	GK	(Canada) Baj Maan	(Canada) Simcoe County Rovers	Contract expired	November 15, 2022	
70	GK	(Estonia) Andreas Vaikla	(Canada) Scrosoppi FC	Contract expired	November 15, 2022	
35	MF	(Tunisia) Mehdi Essoussi	(Canada) Alliance United FC	Contract expired	November 15, 2022	
72	MF	(Canada) Steffen Yeates	(Canada) Pacific FC	Contract expired	November 15, 2022	
80	FW	(United States) Paul Rothrock	(United States) Tacoma Defiance	Contract expired	November 15, 2022	
58	DF	(Canada) Kobe Franklin	(Canada) Toronto FC	Signed with first team	February 24, 2023	
52	MF	(Spain) Alonso Coello	(Canada) Toronto FC	Signed with first team	April 6, 2023	
90	GK	(Canada) Luka Gavran	(Canada) Toronto FC	Signed with first team	August 20, 2023	

==== Loaned out ====
No.	Pos.	Player	To	Fee/notes	Date	Source
52	MF	(Spain) Alonso Coello	(Canada) Toronto FC	Short term loans (March 24, March 31)	March 24, 2023	
71	MF	(Canada) Markus Cimermancic	(Canada) Toronto FC	Short term loans (March 24, May 20, July 8)	March 24, 2023	
65	DF	(Canada) Antony Curic	(Canada) Toronto FC	Short term loans (May 13, May 17, May 20)	May 13, 2023	
72	FW	(Canada) Jordan Faria	(Canada) Toronto FC	Short term loan	May 20, 2023	
90	GK	(Canada) Luka Gavran	(Canada) Toronto FC	Short term loans (June 21, June 24, July 1)	June 21, 2023	
76	DF	(Canada) Lazar Stefanovic	(Canada) Toronto FC	Short term loans (July 1, July 30)	July 1, 2023	
73	MF	(Honduras) Jesús Batiz	(Canada) Toronto FC	Short term loans (July 4, July 8, July 30)	July 4, 2023	
51	DF	(Canada) Adam Pearlman	(Canada) Toronto FC	Short term loans (July 4, July 8, August 30)	July 4, 2023	
40	GK	(Canada) Adisa De Rosario	(Canada) HFX Wanderers FC	Loan until September 15, 2023	August 4, 2023	
38	DF	(Canada) Jalen Watson	(Canada) Pacific FC	Loan	August 18, 2023	
82	MF	(Canada) Julian Altobelli	(Canada) Toronto FC	Short term loan	October 4, 2023	

== Pre-season and friendlies ==
Win Draw Loss Fixtures

March 19, 2023 Friendly	Toronto FC II	0–2	York United FC	Toronto, Ontario
7:45 PM		Report	dos Santos 38'; De Rosario 59'	Stadium: BMO Training Centre at Downsview Park; Referee: Yusri Rudolph

April 7, 2023 Friendly	Toronto FC II	1–1	Simcoe County Rovers FC
	Altobelli	Report	Halley	Referee: Ryan Schwenger

== Competitions ==
=== MLS Next Pro ===
==== Standings ====
Eastern Conference

Pos	Div	Team	Pld	W	SOW	SOL	L	GF	GA	GD	Pts
9	CT	Huntsville City FC	28	9	4	3	12	48	45	+3	38
10	CT	Atlanta United 2	28	9	2	4	13	50	52	−2	35
11	NE	Toronto FC II	28	6	3	5	14	43	57	−14	29
12	CT	FC Cincinnati 2	28	7	2	2	17	37	65	−28	27
13	CT	Inter Miami CF II	28	5	1	5	17	34	68	−34	22

Source: MLSNP Eastern Conference
Rules for classification: 1) points; 2) total wins; 3) total goal differential; 4) total goals scored; 5) fewer disciplinary points; 6) away goal differential; 7) away goals scored; 8) home goals differential; 9) home goals scored; 10) coin toss (2 clubs tied) or drawing of lots (≥3 clubs tied)

Overall table

Pos	Team	Pld	W	SOW	SOL	L	GF	GA	GD	Pts
21	Whitecaps FC 2	28	8	3	4	13	36	49	−13	34
22	Real Monarchs	28	8	2	3	15	27	54	−27	31
23	Toronto FC II	28	6	3	5	14	43	57	−14	29
24	FC Cincinnati 2	28	7	2	2	17	37	65	−28	27
25	Los Angeles FC 2	28	6	0	7	15	30	39	−9	25

Source: MLSNP
Rules for classification: 1) points; 2) total wins; 3) total goal differential; 4) total goals scored; 5) fewer disciplinary points; 6) away goal differential; 7) away goals scored; 8) home goals differential; 9) home goals scored; 10) coin toss (2 clubs tied) or drawing of lots (≥3 clubs tied)

==== Match results ====
March 27, 2023 1	FC Cincinnati 2	4–2	Toronto FC II	Highland Heights, Kentucky
7:00 PM	Castellano 7'; Ordóñez 47', 81'; Valenzuela 56'	Report	Walkes 24'; Díaz 29' (pen.)	Stadium: NKU Soccer Stadium; Referee: Kevin Fikar

March 31, 2023 2	Chicago Fire FC II	2–0	Toronto FC II	Bridgeview, Illinois
7:00 PM	Leonard 55'; Ostrem 58'	Report		Stadium: SeatGeek Stadium; Referee: Nabil Bensalah
Note: The match start time was delayed due to weather concerns

April 14, 2023 3	Toronto FC II	0–2	New York City FC II	Toronto, Ontario
7:00 PM		Report	Myers 29', 47'	Stadium: York Lions Stadium; Referee: Sebastian Noshinravani

April 23, 2023 4	Philadelphia Union II	3–3 (5–4 SO)	Toronto FC II	Chester, Pennsylvania
2:00 PM	Rafanello 13'; Riasco 14'; Stojanovic 82'	Report	Curic 56'; Mbongue 68'; Batiz 74' (pen.)	Stadium: Subaru Park; Referee: Gary Gutierrez
	Shootout
	Craig (penalty scored); Pierre (penalty scored); Stojanovic (penalty scored); Pérez (penalty scored); Odada (penalty scored)		Curic (penalty scored); Altobelli (penalty scored); Antonoglou (penalty scored); Batiz (penalty scored); Thompson (penalty missed)

April 30, 2023 5	Orlando City B	3–2	Toronto FC II	Kissimmee, Florida
6:00 PM	Freeman 48'; Salim 84'; Tablante 90+1'	Report	Batiz 3'; Mbongue 54'	Stadium: Osceola County Stadium; Referee: Natalie Simon

May 7, 2023 6	Toronto FC II	3–0	FC Cincinnati 2	Toronto, Ontario
7:00PM	Faria 16', 36'; Mbongue 81'	Report		Stadium: York Lions Stadium; Referee: Roberto D'Alesio

May 14, 2023 7	Toronto FC II	2–3	New England Revolution II	Toronto, Ontario
7:00 PM	Catavolo 3'; Batiz 39'	Report	Cimermancic 44' (o.g.); Rivera 84', 85'	Stadium: York Lions Stadium; Referee: Aubrey Kotelko

May 21, 2023 8	Toronto FC II	3–2	Chicago Fire FC II	Toronto, Ontario
7:00 PM	Altobelli 50', 65'; Díaz 80'	Report	Osorio 31' (pen.); Nesci 48'	Stadium: York Lions Stadium; Referee: Mario Al-Ayass

May 25, 2023 9	New York City FC II	3–1	Toronto FC II	Queens, New York City, New York
7:00 PM	Di Ponzio 41'; Beer 58'; Jiménez 83'	Report	Díaz 36'	Stadium: Belson Stadium; Referee: Nickrod Fateh

May 28, 2023 10	Atlanta United 2	2–0	Toronto FC II	Kennesaw, Georgia
6:00 PM	Gavran 29' (o.g.); Tmimi 49'	Report		Stadium: Fifth Third Bank Stadium; Referee: Anya Voigt

June 4, 2023 11	Toronto FC II	3–0	Orlando City B	Toronto, Ontario
9:00 PM	Walkes 31'; Cimermancic 35'; Batiz 64'	Report		Stadium: York Lions Stadium; Referee: Ryan Schwenger
Note: The match was originally scheduled for an 8:00 pm start, being changed to 9:00 pm on gameday. The match was abandoned in the 72nd minute due to the lights shutting off, with the result considered final.

June 11, 2023 12	Inter Miami CF II	1–1 (4–5 SO)	Toronto FC II	Fort Lauderdale, Florida
6:00 PM	Sunderland 38'	Report	Batiz 50' (pen.)	Stadium: DRV PNK Stadium; Referee: John Rush
	Shootout
	Sessock (penalty scored); Perkovich (penalty missed); Convers (penalty scored); Morales (penalty missed); D'Agostini (penalty scored); Boatwright (penalty scored); Sar-Sar (penalty missed)		Curic (penalty scored); Catavolo (penalty scored); Antonoglou (penalty missed); Batiz (penalty scored); Pearlman (penalty missed); Faria (penalty scored); Cimermancic (penalty scored)
Note: The match was delayed in the 43rd minute due to weather conditions.

June 15, 2023 13	Toronto FC II	1–2	Huntsville City FC	Toronto, Ontario
7:00 PM	Batiz 90+4'	Report	Amiche 29'; Drack 64'	Stadium: York Lions Stadium; Referee: Seyed-Mohammad Mohseni

June 18, 2023 14	Toronto FC II	0–0 (4–3 SO)	Atlanta United 2	Toronto, Ontario
7:00 PM		Report		Stadium: York Lions Stadium; Referee: Jérémie Blanchette
	Shootout
	Curic (penalty scored); Altobelli (penalty scored); Batiz (penalty missed); Antonoglou (penalty scored); Faria (penalty scored)		Conway (penalty scored); Carleton (penalty scored); Tmimi (penalty missed); Villal (penalty missed); Tiente (penalty scored)

June 23, 2023 15	New England Revolution II	1–1 (4–2 SO)	Toronto FC II	Foxborough, Massachusetts
8:00 PM	Adebayo-Smith 37'	Report	Altobelli 61'	Stadium: Gillette Stadium; Referee: Calin Radosav
	Shootout
	Marcos Dias (penalty scored); Akanyirige (penalty scored); Adebayo-Smith (penalty missed); Awashie (penalty scored); Greenidge-Duncan (penalty scored)		Altobelli (penalty scored); Díaz (penalty scored); Stojadinovic (penalty missed); Adenuga (penalty missed)

June 30, 2023 16	Toronto FC II	1–2	Crown Legacy FC	Toronto, Ontario
7:00 PM	Faria 55'	Report	Poreba 65'; João Pedro 90+3' (pen.)	Stadium: York Lions Stadium; Referee: Youcef Boumsied

July 7, 2023 17	Toronto FC II	2–3	Columbus Crew 2	Toronto, Ontario
7:00 PM	Cimermancic 39'; Walkes 41'	Report	Goulbourne 34' (o.g.); Hughes 50'; Micaletto 58'	Stadium: York Lions Stadium; Referee: Mazen Hassanin

July 12, 2023 18	Toronto FC II	1–1 (4–2 SO)	Philadelphia Union II	Toronto, Ontario
7:00 PM	Curic 83'	Report	Rafanello 55'	Stadium: York Lions Stadium; Referee: Ryan Schwenger
	Shootout
	Curic (penalty missed); Díaz (penalty scored); Catavolo (penalty scored); Batiz (penalty scored); Altobelli (penalty scored)		Olney (penalty missed); Le Guennec (penalty scored); Stojanovic (penalty scored); Tucker (penalty missed)

July 16, 2023 19	Huntsville City FC	1–2	Toronto FC II	Huntsville, Alabama
7:00 PM	Liadi 28' (pen.)	Report	Batiz 37'; Adenuga 78'	Stadium: Joe W. Davis Stadium; Attendance: 5,505; Referee: Rebecca Pagan

July 21, 2023 20	Toronto FC II	6–1	Inter Miami CF II	Toronto, Ontario
7:00 PM	Walkes 61'; Mbongue 66', 75'; Batiz 80'; Antonoglou 88'; Barrow 90+3'	Report	Valencia 5'	Stadium: York Lions Stadium; Referee: Isabelle Duclos

August 3, 2023 21	Columbus Crew 2	4–0	Toronto FC II	Columbus, Ohio
7:00 PM	Micaletto 28' (33); Bunbury 55'; Gannon 80'	Report		Stadium: Historic Crew Stadium; Referee: Benjamin Meyer
Note: Game originally scheduled for August 4

August 9, 2023 22	New York Red Bulls II	1–2	Toronto FC II	Montclair, New Jersey
7:00 PM	Shapiro-Thompson 23'	Report	Barrow 87'; Morgan 90+4'	Stadium: MSU Soccer Park at Pittser Field; Referee: Kenneth Rojas

August 18, 2023 23	Toronto FC II	0–0 (1–4 SO)	New England Revolution II	Toronto, Ontario
7:00 PM		Report		Stadium: York Lions Stadium; Referee: Mazen Hassanin
	Shootout
	Batiz (penalty missed); Altobelli (penalty missed); Pearlman (penalty scored)		Rozhansky (penalty scored); Escobar (penalty scored); Akanyirige (penalty scored); Adebayo-Smith (penalty scored)

August 25, 2023 24	Crown Legacy FC	1–1 (3–1 SO)	Toronto FC II	Matthews, North Carolina
7:30 PM	João Pedro 90+9'	Report	Faria 83'	Stadium: Sportsplex at Matthews; Referee: John Matto
	Shootout
	Petković (penalty missed); Josué Rodrigues (penalty scored); Poreba (penalty scored); Williams (penalty scored)		Pearlman (penalty scored); Olguin (penalty missed); Faria (penalty missed); Stefanovic (penalty missed)

September 1, 2023 25	Toronto FC II	0–3	New York Red Bulls II	Toronto, Ontario
7:00 PM		Report	Sofo 23'; Mullings 32', 35'	Stadium: York Lions Stadium; Referee: Youcef Boumsied

September 8, 2023 26	Philadelphia Union II	5–3	Toronto FC II	Chester, Pennsylvania
7:00 PM	Donovan 24', 84'; Westfield 50'; Stojanovic 55'; Rafanello 58'	Report	Jahkeele Marshall-Rutty 6'; Morgan 76'; Walkes 86'	Stadium: Subaru Park; Referee: Austin Saini

September 15, 2023 27	New York City FC II	3–3 (4–1 SO)	Toronto FC II	Queens, New York City, New York
5:00 PM	Arévalo 12'; Turnbull 45+1'; Jiménez 55'	Report	Díaz 28', 29'; Walkes 88' (pen.)	Stadium: Belson Stadium; Referee: Thomas Snyder
	Shootout
	Myers (penalty scored); Elias (penalty scored); Benalcazar (penalty scored); Owusu (penalty scored)		Altobelli (penalty scored); Catavolo (penalty missed); Walkes (penalty missed)

September 24, 2023 28	Toronto FC II	0–4	Crown Legacy FC	Toronto, Ontario
2:00PM		Report	Williams 15', 66'; Petković 78'; Tavares 84'	Stadium: York Lions Stadium; Referee: Mario Al-Ayass

== Statistics ==
=== Goals ===
Rank	Nation	Player	MLS Next Pro	Playoffs	Total
1	(Honduras)	Jesús Batiz	8	0	8
2	(Canada)	Reshaun Walkes	6	0	6
3	(Canada)	Hugo Mbongue	5	0	5
3	(Puerto Rico)	Alec Díaz	5	0	5
5	(Canada)	Jordan Faria	4	0	4
6	(Canada)	Julian Altobelli	3	0	3
7	(Canada)	Dékwon Barrow	2	0	2
7	(Canada)	Markus Cimermancic	2	0	2
7	(Canada)	Antony Curic	2	0	2
7	(Canada)	Myles Morgan	2	0	2
11	(Canada)	Ife Adenuga	1	0	1
11	(Canada)	Themi Antonoglou	1	0	1
11	(Canada)	Matthew Catavolo	1	0	1
11	(Canada)	Jahkeele Marshall-Rutty	1	0	1
Own goals			0	0	0
Totals			42	0	42

Updated to match played September 15, 2023
Source: Stats Crew

=== Shutouts ===
Rank	Nation	Player	Pos.	MLS Next Pro	Playoffs	Total
1	(Canada)	Luka Gavran	GK	3	0	3
2	(Canada)	Gianluca Catalano	GK	1	0	1
Totals				4	0	4

Updated to match played August 18, 2023
Source: Stats Crew
