= 2022 Toronto FC II season =

Toronto FC II
2022 season
- Owner: Maple Leaf Sports & Entertainment
- Manager: Gianni Cimini
- 2022 MLS Next Pro season: 1st, Northeast Division; 2nd, Eastern Conference; 7th, Overall
- Playoffs: Conference Finals
- Top goalscorer: Paul Rothrock (8)
- Biggest win: TOR 3–0 ORL (8/7)
- Biggest defeat: TOR 2–6 CHI (5/27)

The 2022 Toronto FC II season was the seventh season of play in the club's history. The club moved to MLS Next Pro for the season after previously playing in USL League One.

During the regular season, Toronto FC II won the Northeast Division and finished second in the Eastern Conference. In the playoffs, they defeated Philadelphia Union 2 in the Conference Semi-Finals, before being defeated by Columbus Crew 2 in the Conference Finals, after extra time.

== Team roster ==
MLS Next Pro allows for up to 35 players on a roster. Roster slots 1 through 24 are reserved for players on professional contracts. The remaining 11 slots are for amateur MLS Academy players (who are unpaid, must be under the age of 21, be part of the team's academy, and have never signed a professional contract or played in the NCAA).

As of September 3, 2022

No.	Pos.	Nation	Player
33	FW	CAN	Reshaun Walkes
34	DF	CAN	Klaidi Cela
35	MF	CAN	Mehdi Essoussi
40	GK	CAN	Adisa De Rosario
50	GK	CAN	Andrew Romano
51	DF	RSA	Adam Pearlman
52	MF	ESP	Alonso Coello Camarero
58	DF	CAN	Kobe Franklin
60	GK	CAN	Baj Maan
62	DF	CAN	Rohan Goulbourne
63	DF	CAN	Joseph Daher
64	MF	JPN	Kota Sakurai
65	DF	CAN	Antony Curic
68	MF	CAN	Nakye Greenidge-Duncan
71	MF	CAN	Markus Cimermancic
72	MF	CAN	Steffen Yeates
73	FW	CAN	Stefan Karajovanovic
74	MF	CAN	Kundai Mawoko
75	MF	CAN	Luca Accettola
76	FW	CAN	Shayan Soltanzadeh
78	FW	CAN	Keegan Walker
80	FW	USA	Paul Rothrock
82	MF	CAN	Julian Altobelli
83	FW	CAN	Hugo Mbongue
84	DF	CAN	Joshua Gordan
85	MF	CAN	Antonio Carlini
86	FW	PUR	Alec Díaz
89	DF	CAN	Matthew Medeiros
90	GK	CAN	Luka Gavran
92	DF	CAN	Lazar Stefanovic
93	DF	CAN	Thomas DiClemente
95	GK	CAN	Isaiah Goldson

Toronto FC Academy player

Players out on loan
No.	Position	Player	Nation
70	GK	EST	Andreas Vaikla (at FC Edmonton)

First team players who have been loaned to TFC II in 2022
No.	Position	Player	Nation
1	GK	TRI	Greg Ranjitsingh
8	MF	CAN	Ralph Priso
12	DF	CAN	Kadin Chung
22	FW	CAN	Jacob Shaffelburg
77	FW	CAN	Jordan Perruzza
81	MF	CAN	Themi Antonoglou

Priso has since been traded to another MLS club and is no longer eligible
Shaffelburg has since been loaned to another MLS club and is no longer eligible

Players no longer on roster
No.	Position	Player	Nation
91	DF	CAN	Daniel Gogarty

Toronto FC Academy player

== Coaching staff ==
As of March 3, 2022

Coaching staff
Head coach	(Canada) Gianni Cimini
Assistant coach	(Canada) Marco Casalinuovo
Assistant coach	(Canada) Yianni Michelis
Goalkeeping coach	(Canada) David Monsalve

== Transfers ==
Note: All figures in United States dollars.

=== In ===
==== Transferred In ====
No.	Pos.	Player	From	Fee/notes	Date	Source
90	GK	(Canada) Luka Gavran	(United States) St. John's Red Storm	Toronto FC draft pick, Signed to second team	March 24, 2022	
33	FW	(Canada) Reshaun Walkes	(United States) Texas–Rio Grande Valley	Toronto FC draft pick, Signed to second team	March 24, 2022	
86	FW	(Puerto Rico) Alec Díaz	(United States) Tacoma Defiance		March 30, 2022	
73	FW	(Canada) Stefan Karajovanovic	(Canada) HFX Wanderers FC		March 31, 2022	
34	DF	(Canada) Klaidi Cela	(Canada) Forge FC		March 31, 2022	
52	MF	(Spain) Alonso Coello Camarero	(United States) Florida Atlantic Owls		April 1, 2022	
64	MF	(Japan) Kota Sakurai	(United States) Dartmouth Big Green		April 1, 2022	
51	DF	(South Africa) Adam Pearlman	(Canada) Toronto FC Academy		April 8, 2022	
91	DF	(Canada) Daniel Gogarty	Unattached	Short-term agreement	April 23, 2022	
60	GK	(Canada) Baj Maan	(Canada) Forge FC		May 7, 2022	
83	ST	(Canada) Hugo Mbongue	(Canada) Toronto FC Academy	Signed to professional contract	May 27, 2022	
40	GK	(Canada) Adisa De Rosario	(Canada) HFX Wanderers FC	CPL Developmental contract ended	September 29, 2022	

==== Loaned in ====
No.	Pos.	Player	From	Fee/notes	Date	Source
1	GK	(Trinidad and Tobago) Greg Ranjitsingh	(Canada) Toronto FC	Loan from first team	April 8, 2022	
81	MF	(Canada) Themi Antonoglou	(Canada) Toronto FC	Loan from first team	May 14, 2022	
8	MF	(Canada) Ralph Priso	(Canada) Toronto FC	Loan from first team	June 11, 2022	
12	DF	(Canada) Kadin Chung	(Canada) Toronto FC	Loan from first team	June 11, 2022	
77	FW	(Canada) Jordan Perruzza	(Canada) Toronto FC	Loan from first team	June 11, 2022	
22	FW	(Canada) Jacob Shaffelburg	(Canada) Toronto FC	Loan from first team	July 3, 2022	

=== Out ===
==== Transferred out ====
No.	Pos.	Player	To	Fee/notes	Date	Source
33	DF	(Canada) Nyal Higgins	(Canada) FC Edmonton	Contract expired	December 31, 2021	
34	DF	(United States) Talen Maples	(United States) Houston Dynamo 2	Contract expired	December 31, 2021	
40	GK	(United States) Caleb Patterson-Sewell	Retired	Retired	December 31, 2021	
48	MF	(Canada) Dante Campbell	(United States) LA Galaxy II	Contract expired	December 31, 2021	
49	FW	(United States) Garrett McLaughlin	(United States) North Carolina FC	Contract expired	December 31, 2021	
51	MF	(Chile) Nicolás Ovalle Raffo		Option declined	December 31, 2021	
60	GK	(Canada) Brogan Engbers		Option declined	December 31, 2021	
64	DF	(United States) Kevin Politz	Retired	Option declined	December 31, 2021	
71	MF	(Spain) Enric Bernat Lunar	(Spain) FC Ascó	Option declined	December 31, 2021	
38	DF	(Canada) Luca Petrasso	(Canada) Toronto FC	Signed with first team	January 11, 2022	
84	MF	(Canada) Kwasi Poku	(Canada) Forge FC	Academy player	February 2, 2022	
52	MF	(Canada) Kosi Thompson	(Canada) Toronto FC	Signed with first team	February 25, 2022	
81	MF	(Canada) Themi Antonoglou	(Canada) Toronto FC	Signed with first team	May 7, 2022	
91	DF	(Canada) Daniel Gogarty	(Canada) Vaughan Azzurri	Short-term deal expired	May 31, 2022	

==== Loaned out ====
No.	Pos.	Player	To	Fee/notes	Date	Source
70	GK	(Estonia) Andreas Vaikla	(Canada) FC Edmonton	One-year loan	March 24, 2022	
58	DF	(Canada) Kobe Franklin	(Canada) Toronto FC	4-day loans (April 1, April 23, May 4, May 7)	April 1, 2022	
51	DF	(South Africa) Adam Pearlman	(Canada) Toronto FC	4-day loans (April 15, May 14, May 24)	April 15, 2022	
81	MF	(Canada) Themi Antonoglou	(Canada) Toronto FC	4-day loans (April 15, April 23, April 29, May 4)	April 15, 2022	
72	MF	(Canada) Steffen Yeates	(Canada) Toronto FC	4-day loans (May 4, May 7)	May 4, 2022	
80	FW	(United States) Paul Rothrock	(Canada) Toronto FC	4-day loans (May 4, May 7, May 14)	May 4, 2022	
35	MF	(Canada) Mehdi Essoussi	(Canada) Toronto FC	4-day loans (May 21)	May 21, 2022	
40	GK	(Canada) Adisa De Rosario	(Canada) HFX Wanderers FC	Academy player; Signed developmental contract	August 18, 2022	

== Pre-season and friendlies ==
March 26 Friendly	Toronto FC II	3–0	York United FC	Toronto, Ontario
11:00am	Goal	Report

July 23 MLS Next Pro Invitational	Toronto FC II	1–1 (4–3 SO)	(England) Chelsea U21	Herriman, Utah
	Goulbourne 56'	Report	Haigh 22'	Stadium: Zions Bank Stadium; Referee: Joseph Semus
	Shootout
	Rothrock (penalty scored); Franklin (penalty missed); Essoussi (penalty scored); Yeates (penalty scored); Greenidge-Duncan (penalty scored); Mbongue (penalty scored)		Mbuyamba (penalty scored); Webster (penalty scored); Soonsup-Bell (penalty missed); Burstow (penalty scored); Hutchinson (penalty scored); Hall (penalty missed)

August 3 Friendly	Toronto FC II	0–1	(England) Sunderland U21	Regina, Saskatchewan
		Report 1 Report 2	Thompson 25'	Stadium: Mosaic Stadium

== Competitions ==
=== MLS Next Pro ===
==== Standings ====
Pos	Div	Team	Pld	W	SOW	SOL	L	GF	GA	GD	Pts	Qualification
1	CT	Columbus Crew 2	24	16	2	3	3	62	22	+40	55	Qualification for the 2022 MLS Next Pro Playoffs
2	NE	Toronto FC II	24	12	2	1	9	44	38	+6	41	Qualification for the 2022 MLS Next Pro Playoffs
3	NE	Philadelphia Union II	24	11	3	1	9	42	39	+3	40	Qualification for the 2022 MLS Next Pro Playoffs
4	NE	Rochester New York FC	24	10	4	2	8	37	30	+7	40	Qualification for the 2022 MLS Next Pro Playoffs
5	NE	New York City FC II	24	9	4	2	9	49	35	+14	37	

Source: MLSNP Eastern Conference
Rules for classification: 1) points; 2) total wins; 3) total goal differential; 4) total goals scored; 5) fewer disciplinary points; 6) away goal differential; 7) away goals scored; 8) home goals differential; 9) home goals scored; 10) coin toss (2 clubs tied) or drawing of lots (≥3 clubs tied)

==== Match Results ====
April 3 1	FC Cincinnati 2	2–1	Toronto FC II	Highland Heights, Kentucky
2:00 PM EDT	Ordonez 4'; Cela 72' (o.g.)	Report	Antonoglou 10'	Stadium: NKU Soccer Stadium; Referee: Luis Arroyo

April 10 2	Toronto FC II	3–1	New York City FC II	Toronto, Ontario
1:00 PM EDT	Rothrock 45'; Mbongue 75', 80'	Report	Beer 56'	Stadium: York Lions Stadium; Referee: Ben Hoskins

April 17 3	Toronto FC II	4–2	Chicago Fire FC II	Toronto, Ontario
2:00 PM EDT	Franklin 21'; Rothrock 61'; Greenidge-Duncan 71'; Díaz 88'	Report	Monis 5'; L.Bezerra 59'	Stadium: York Lions Stadium; Referee: Marie-Soleil Beaudoin

April 24 4	Columbus Crew 2	2–1	Toronto FC II	Columbus, Ohio
2:00 PM EDT	Russell-Rowe 25'; Gannon 46'	Report	Mbongue 20'	Stadium: Historic Crew Stadium

April 30 5	Toronto FC II	4–2	FC Cincinnati 2	Toronto, Ontario
7:00 PM EDT	Rothrock 50'; Walkes 66'; Altobelli 74'; Marshall 90+5' (o.g.)	Report	Valenzuela 12'; Ruszel 47'	Stadium: BMO Field; Referee: Mario Alayass

May 8 6	New York City FC II	4–1	Toronto FC II	New York City, New York
4:00 PM EDT	Jimenez 20'; Denis 68' (pen.); Elias 81'; Youssoufi 90+1'	Report	Alonso Coello Camarero 45' (pen.)	Stadium: Belson Stadium; Referee: Kenneth Rojas

May 14 7	Toronto FC II	0–1	New England Revolution II	Toronto, Ontario
7:00 PM EDT		Report	Dias 47'	Stadium: BMO Field; Referee: Michael Venne

May 22 8	Columbus Crew 2	4–2	Toronto FC II	Columbus, Ohio
12:00 PM EDT	Micaletto 1'; Russell-Rowe 54'; Fuson 60'; Parente 70'	Report	Yeates 29'; Altobelli 64'	Stadium: Lower.com Field; Referee: John Matto
Note: The match was originally scheduled for May 21 at 7:00 pm, but was changed due to inclement weather.

May 27 9	Toronto FC II	2–6	Chicago Fire FC II	Toronto, Ontario
7:00 PM EDT	Mbongue 87'; Antonoglou 90+1'	Report	Penn 12', 20', 34'; Glasgow 54'; Kocs-Washburn 68'; Rodriguez 72'	Stadium: York Lions Stadium; Referee: Renzo Villanueva

June 2 10	Rochester New York FC	1–1 (4–3 SO)	Toronto FC II	Brighton, New York
7:00 PM EDT	Batiz 78'	Report	Antonoglou 85'	Stadium: Monroe Community College; Referee: Nickrod Fateh
	Shootout
	Rayo (penalty scored); Lopez (penalty scored); Costa (penalty scored); Djaló (penalty missed); Dolabella (penalty scored)		Alonso Coello Camarero (penalty scored); Franklin (penalty scored); Karajovanovic (penalty missed); Yeates (penalty scored); Mbongue (penalty missed)

June 11 11	Toronto FC II	1–0	Philadelphia Union II	Toronto, Ontario
6:00 PM EDT	Greenidge-Duncan 90+2'	Report		Stadium: York Lions Stadium; Referee: Youcef Boumsied

June 18 12	New York City FC II	0–2	Toronto FC II	New York City, New York
1:00 PM EDT		Report	Julian Altobelli 50'; Antonoglou 75'	Stadium: Belson Stadium; Referee: Justin Saporito

July 3 14	Toronto FC II	1–1 (5–3 SO)	Toronto FC II	Toronto, Ontario
7:00 PM EDT	Yeates 84' (pen.)	Report	Dias 50'	Stadium: York Lions Stadium; Referee: Mario Alayass
	Shootout
	Altobelli (penalty scored); Franklin (penalty scored); Antonoglou (penalty scored); Alonso Coello Camarero (penalty scored); Paul Rothrock (penalty scored)		Dias (penalty missed); Rozhansky (penalty scored); O'Hearn (penalty scored); Buck (penalty scored)

July 10 15	Toronto FC II	0–0 (4–3 SO)	Columbus Crew 2	Toronto, Ontario
7:00 PM EDT		Report		Stadium: York Lions Stadium; Referee: Scott Decker
	Shootout
	Yeates (penalty missed); Franklin (penalty scored); Antonoglou (penalty scored); Alonso Coello Camarero (penalty missed); Greenidge-Duncan (penalty scored); Díaz (penalty scored)		Gannon (penalty missed); Micaletto (penalty missed); Morris (penalty scored); Parente (penalty scored); Angking (penalty scored); Telfer (penalty missed)

July 18 16	Philadelphia Union II	1–2	Toronto FC II	Chester, Pennsylvania
6:00 PM EDT	Real 70'	Report	Karajovanovic 17'; Altobelli 89'	Stadium: Subaru Park; Referee: Scarlet Agrawal

July 31 17	New England Revolution II	0–2	Toronto FC II	Foxborough, Massachusetts
1:00 PM EDT		Report	Rothrock 68', 73'	Stadium: Gillette Stadium; Referee: Shawn Tehini

August 7 18	Toronto FC II	3–0	Orlando City B	Toronto, Ontario
7:00 PM EDT	Walkes 67', 84'; Altobelli 71'	Report		Stadium: York Lions Stadium; Referee: Sebastian Noshinravani

August 12 19	Rochester New York FC	1–2	Toronto FC II	Brighton, New York
7:00 PM EDT	Rayo 68'	Report	Greenidge-Duncan 14'; Walkes 76'	Stadium: Monroe Community College; Referee: Thomas Snyder

August 21 20	Toronto FC II	2–1	FC Cincinnati 2	Toronto, Ontario
6:00 PM EDT	Rothrock 2'; Díaz 84'	Report	Penagos 79'	Stadium: York Lions Stadium; Referee: Jérémie Blanchette

August 25 21	Chicago Fire FC II	2–1	Toronto FC II	Bridgeview, Illinois
8:00 PM EDT	Fleming 38'; M. Rodríguez 57'	Report	Yeates 70'	Stadium: SeatGeek Stadium; Referee: Youssef Elmessoussi

September 3 22	Inter Miami CF II	1–4	Toronto FC II	Fort Lauderdale, Florida
7:00 PM EDT	Cremaschi 73'	Report	Perruzza 7'; Walkes 75'; Karajovanovic 90+1'; Carlini 90+6' (pen.)	Stadium: DRV PNK Stadium

September 11 23	Toronto FC II	0–1	Rochester New York FC	Toronto, Ontario
3:00 PM EDT		Report	Batiz 17'	Stadium: York Lions Stadium; Referee: Mario Alayass

September 14 13	Toronto FC II	3–4	Inter Miami CF II	Toronto, Ontario
7:00 PM EDT	Perruzza 41'; Chung 51'; Rothrock 77'	Report	Hundal 49', 55'; Cremaschi 65'; Borgelin 86'	Stadium: York Lions Stadium; Referee: Roberto D'Alesio
Note: Rescheduled match from June 24

September 18 24	Orlando City B	1–2	Toronto FC II	Kissimmee, Florida
3:00 PM EDT	Tablante 55'	Report	Walkes 86'; Franklin 90'	Stadium: Osceola Heritage Park; Referee: Matthew Franz

==== Playoffs ====
September 24 Conference Semifinals	Toronto FC II	1–0	Philadelphia Union II	Toronto, Ontario
4:00 PM EDT	Mbongue 6'	Report	Sorenson (yellow card) 33'; Villero (yellow card) 39'; Turner (yellow card) 81'; Paternina (yellow card) 85'	Stadium: BMO Field; Referee: Michael Venne

October 2 Conference Final	Columbus Crew 2	4–3 (a.e.t.)	Toronto FC II	Columbus, Ohio
4:00 PM EDT	Fuson 32'; Parente 60' (pen.); Knight 109'; Gannon 119'	Report	Rothrock 47'; Antonoglou 90+3', 94'	Stadium: Historic Crew Stadium; Referee: Sergii Demianchuk

== Statistics ==
=== Goals ===
Rank	Nation	Player	MLS Next Pro	Playoffs	Total
1	(United States)	Paul Rothrock	7	1	8
2	(Canada)	Reshaun Walkes	6	0	6
2	(Canada)	Themi Antonoglou	4	2	6
4	(Canada)	Julian Altobelli	5	0	5
4	(Canada)	Hugo Mbongue	4	1	5
6	(Canada)	Nakye Greenidge-Duncan	3	0	3
6	(Canada)	Steffen Yeates	3	0	3
8	(Puerto Rico)	Alec Díaz	2	0	2
8	(Canada)	Stefan Karajovanovic	2	0	2
8	(Canada)	Jordan Perruzza	2	0	2
8	(Canada)	Kobe Franklin	1	0	1
12	(Spain)	Alonso Coello Camarero	1	0	1
12	(Canada)	Kadin Chung	1	0	1
12	(Canada)	Antonio Carlini	1	0	1
Own goals			1	0	1
Totals			44	4	48

Updated to match played October 2, 2022
Source: Stats Crew

=== Shutouts ===
Rank	Nation	Player	Pos.	MLS Next Pro	Playoffs	Total
1	(Canada)	Luka Gavran	GK	5	1	6
Totals				5	1	6

Updated to match played September 24, 2022
Source: Stats Crew
