= 2023 Toronto FC season =

Toronto FC 2023 soccer season

Toronto FC
2023 season
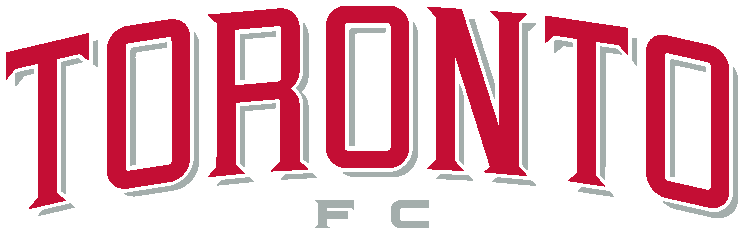
- Owner: Maple Leaf Sports & Entertainment
- President: Bill Manning
- Head coach: Bob Bradley (until June 26); Terry Dunfield (interim, from June 26 to September 30); John Herdman (from October 1)
- Stadium: BMO Field
- Major League Soccer: Conference: 15th Overall: 29th
- MLS Cup playoffs: Did not qualify
- Canadian Championship: Quarter-finals
- Leagues Cup: Group stage
- Top goalscorer: League: Federico Bernardeschi; Deandre Kerr (5 each); All: Federico Bernardeschi; Lorenzo Insigne; Deandre Kerr (5 each)
- Average home league attendance: 25,310
- Biggest win: TOR 2–0 MIA (March 18); TOR 3–1 PHI (August 30)
- Biggest defeat: NYC 5–0 TOR (July 26, LC GS)
Home colours	Away colours	Third colours

The 2023 Toronto FC season was the 17th season in the history of Toronto FC.

The team finished the regular season in last place with a club-record low of 22 points, and thus failed to qualify for the MLS Cup playoffs for a third consecutive season.

== Squad ==
As of August 29, 2023

No.	Player	Nationality	Position(s)	Date of birth (age)	Signed in	Previous club
Goalkeepers
1	Sean Johnson	(United States)	GK	May 31, 1989 (aged 34)	2023	(United States) New York City FC
18	Greg Ranjitsingh	(Trinidad and Tobago) (Canada)	GK	July 18, 1993 (aged 30)	2022	(United States) MLS Pool
30	Tomás Romero	(El Salvador) (United States)	GK	December 19, 2000 (aged 23)	2023	(United States) Los Angeles FC
90	Luka Gavran	(Canada)	GK	May 9, 2000 (aged 23)	2023	(Canada) Toronto FC II
Defenders
3	Cristián Gutiérrez	(Canada) (Chile)	LB	February 18, 1997 (aged 26)	2023	(Canada) Vancouver Whitecaps FC
6	Aimé Mabika	(Zambia) (United States)	CB	October 16, 1998 (aged 25)	2023	(United States) Inter Miami CF
7	Jahkeele Marshall-Rutty	(Canada)	RB / MF	June 16, 2004 (aged 19)	2020	(Canada) Toronto FC II
17	Sigurd Rosted	(Norway)	CB	July 22, 1994 (aged 29)	2023	(Denmark) Brøndby
19	Kobe Franklin	(Canada)	RB	May 10, 2003 (aged 20)	2023	(Canada) Toronto FC II
26	Luke Singh (loaned out)	(Trinidad and Tobago) (Canada)	CB	September 12, 2000 (aged 23)	2021	(Canada) Toronto FC II
27	Shane O'Neill	(United States) (Republic of Ireland)	CB	September 2, 1993 (aged 30)	2022	(United States) Seattle Sounders FC
28	Raoul Petretta	(Italy) (Germany)	LB	March 24, 1997 (aged 26)	2023	(Turkey) Kasımpaşa
Midfielders
4	Michael Bradley	(United States)	CM / DM	July 31, 1987 (aged 36)	2014	(Italy) Roma
5	Franco Ibarra (on loan)	(Argentina) (Note: Ibarra held a U.S. Green Card, so he counted as a domestic player for MLS purposes.)	MF	April 28, 2001 (aged 22)	2023	(United States) Atlanta United FC
8	Víctor Vázquez	(Spain)	MF	January 20, 1987 (aged 36)	2023	(United States) LA Galaxy
11	Latif Blessing	(Ghana)	MF	December 30, 1996 (aged 27)	2023	(United States) New England Revolution
21	Jonathan Osorio	(Canada)	AM / CM	June 12, 1992 (aged 31)	2013	(Canada) SC Toronto
23	Brandon Servania	(United States)	MF	March 12, 1999 (aged 24)	2023	(United States) FC Dallas
47	Kosi Thompson (loaned out)	(Canada)	MF	January 27, 2003 (aged 20)	2022	(Canada) Toronto FC II
52	Alonso Coello	(Spain)	MF	October 12, 1999 (aged 24)	2023	(Canada) Toronto FC II
81	Themi Antonoglou	(Canada)	MF	June 2, 2001 (aged 22)	2022	(Canada) Toronto FC II
Forwards
9	C. J. Sapong	(United States)	FW	December 27, 1988 (aged 35)	2023	(United States) Nashville SC
10	Federico Bernardeschi	(Italy)	RW	February 16, 1994 (aged 29)	2022	(Italy) Juventus
12	Cassius Mailula	(South Africa)	FW	June 12, 2001 (aged 22)	2023	(South Africa) Mamelodi Sundowns
20	Ayo Akinola (loaned out)	(Canada) (United States)	ST	January 20, 2000 (aged 23)	2018	(Canada) Toronto FC II
24	Lorenzo Insigne	(Italy)	LW	June 4, 1991 (aged 32)	2022	(Italy) Napoli
25	Prince Owusu	(Germany)	FW	January 7, 1997 (aged 26)	2023	(Germany) Jahn Regensburg
29	Deandre Kerr	(Canada)	FW	November 29, 2002 (aged 21)	2022	(United States) Syracuse Orange
77	Jordan Perruzza (loaned out)	(Canada)	FW	January 16, 2001 (aged 22)	2021	(Canada) Toronto FC II
83	Hugo Mbongue	(Canada)	FW	July 27, 2004 (aged 19)	2022	(Canada) Toronto FC II
99	Adama Diomande	(Norway)	FW	February 14, 1990 (aged 33)	2023	(Norway) Odd

Players no longer on roster

No.	Player	Nationality	Position(s)	Date of birth (age)	Departure	Next club
71	Markus Cimermancic	(Canada)	MF	October 1, 2004 (aged 19)	Short-term loan expired	(Canada) Toronto FC II
5	Lukas MacNaughton	(Canada) (United States)	CB	March 8, 1995 (aged 28)	Traded	(United States) Nashville SC
65	Antony Ćurić	(Canada)	DF	January 16, 2001 (aged 22)	Short-term loan expired	(Canada) Toronto FC II
72	Jordan Faria	(Canada)	MF	June 13, 2000 (aged 23)	Short-term loan expired	(Canada) Toronto FC II
22	Richie Laryea	(Canada)	RB	January 7, 1995 (aged 28)	Loan expired	(England) Nottingham Forest
90	Luka Gavran	(Canada)	GK	May 9, 2000 (aged 23)	Short-term loan expired	(Canada) Toronto FC II
76	Lazar Stefanovic	(Canada) (United States)	DF	August 10, 2006 (aged 17)	Short-term loan expired	(Canada) Toronto FC II
73	Jesús Batiz	(Honduras) (United States)	MF	June 14, 1999 (aged 24)	Short-term loan expired	(Canada) Toronto FC II
51	Adam Pearlman	(South Africa) (Canada)	DF	April 5, 2005 (aged 18)	Short-term loan expired	(Canada) Toronto FC II
14	Mark-Anthony Kaye	(Canada)	MF	December 2, 1994 (aged 28)	Traded	(United States) New England Revolution
2	Matt Hedges	(United States)	CB	April 1, 1990 (aged 33)	Traded	(United States) Austin FC
82	Julian Altobelli	(Canada)	MF	November 4, 2002 (aged 21)	Short-term loan expired	(Canada) Toronto FC II

=== Roster slots ===
Toronto had 8+3 international roster slots and three Designated Player slots available for use in the 2022 season. Beginning in 2022, MLS added three non-tradeable international roster spots to the Canadian franchises to compensate for the more complicated residency requirements compared to in the United States; players occupying these additional roster spots were required to have played and been registered with a Canadian MLS club for at least one full year. In 2022, they traded a 2023 international roster spot along with a 2023 MLS SuperDraft first round pick, Ralph Priso, and an undisclosed amount of General Allocation Money in exchange for Mark-Anthony Kaye. In 2023, they traded a 2023 international roster spot, along with Jesús Jiménez in exchange for Brandon Servania. Toronto acquired a 2023 International roster slot in July from the New England Revolution along with Latif Blessing, in exchange for Mark-Anthony Kaye. Toronto acquired a 2023 International roster slot from the San Jose Earthquakes in exchange for loaning Ayo Akinola.

International slots
Slot	Player	Nationality
E1	Víctor Vázquez	Spain
E2		
E3		
R1	Federico Bernardeschi	Italy
R2	Latif Blessing	Ghana
R3	Alonso Coello	Spain
R4	Lorenzo Insigne	Italy
R5	Raoul Petretta	Italy
R6	Sigurd Rosted	Norway
NER1	Cassius Mailula	South Africa
SJE1	Prince Osei Owusu	Germany
R7	Traded to FC Dallas	
R8	Traded to Colorado Rapids	
INJ	Adama Diomande	Norway

Designated Player slots
Slot	Player
1	(Italy) Federico Bernardeschi
2	(Italy) Lorenzo Insigne
3	(Canada) Jonathan Osorio (Note: Jonathan Osorio's salary was at the maximum Targeted Allocation Money amount and was eligible to be bought down below a DP level. However, for the team's salary cap purposes, he utilized a Designated Player slot.)

U22 Initiative slots
Slot	Player
1	(Argentina) Franco Ibarra
2	(South Africa) Cassius Mailula
3	
LOAN	(Canada) Ayo Akinola

== Transfers ==
Note: All figures in United States dollars.

=== In ===
==== Transferred in ====
No.	Pos.	Player	From	Fee/notes	Date	Source
30	GK	(El Salvador) Tomás Romero	(United States) Los Angeles FC	Selected in 2022 MLS Re-Entry Draft Stage One	November 17, 2022	
8	MF	(Spain) Víctor Vázquez	(United States) LA Galaxy	Selected in 2022 MLS Re-Entry Draft Stage Two, Signed	December 16, 2022	
2	DF	(United States) Matt Hedges	(United States) FC Dallas	Free Agent Signing, Targeted Allocation Money	December 19, 2022	
99	FW	(Norway) Adama Diomande	(Norway) Odd	Claimed MLS rights off Waivers	January 12, 2023	
28	DF	(Italy) Raoul Petretta	(Turkey) Kasımpaşa	Transfer, Targeted Allocation Money	January 24, 2023	
1	GK	(United States) Sean Johnson	(United States) New York City FC	Free Agent Signing, Targeted Allocation Money	January 27, 2023	
17	DF	(Norway) Sigurd Rosted	(Denmark) Brøndby	Transfer, Targeted Allocation Money	February 7, 2023	
23	MF	(United States) Brandon Servania	(United States) FC Dallas	Traded for Jesús Jiménez	February 20, 2023	
19	DF	(Canada) Kobe Franklin	(Canada) Toronto FC II	Signed as a homegrown player	February 24, 2023	
3	DF	(Canada) Cristián Gutiérrez	(Canada) Vancouver Whitecaps FC	Claimed off Waivers	March 14, 2023	
52	MF	(Spain) Alonso Coello	(Canada) Toronto FC II	Signed from second team	April 6, 2023	
9	FW	(United States) C. J. Sapong	(United States) Nashville SC	Acquired from Nashville SC for Lukas MacNaughton, $125,000 in GAM, and $75,000 in conditional GAM	April 25, 2023	
6	DF	(Zambia) Aimé Mabika	(United States) Inter Miami CF	Acquired from Inter Miami CF for $100,000 in GAM, and $100,000 in conditional GAM	April 25, 2023	
11	MF	(Ghana) Latif Blessing	(United States) New England Revolution	Acquired along with an International Roster Slot in exchange for Mark-Anthony Kaye	July 13, 2023	
12	FW	(South Africa) Cassius Mailula	(South Africa) Mamelodi Sundowns	U22 Initiative Signing	July 28, 2023	
25	FW	(Germany) Prince Osei Owusu	(Germany) Jahn Regensburg	Undisclosed	August 4, 2023	
90	GK	(Canada) Luka Gavran	(Canada) Toronto FC II	Signed from second team	August 20, 2023	

==== Loaned in ====
No.	Pos.	Player	From	Fee/notes	Date	Source
22	DF	(Canada) Richie Laryea	(England) Nottingham Forest	Loan until June 30, 2023	August 5, 2022	
52	MF	(Spain) Alonso Coello	(Canada) Toronto FC II	Short term loans (March 24, March 31)	March 24, 2023	
71	MF	(Canada) Markus Cimermancic	(Canada) Toronto FC II	Short term loans (March 24, May 20, July 8)	March 24, 2023	
65	DF	(Canada) Antony Ćurić	(Canada) Toronto FC II	Short term loans (May 13, May 17, May 20)	May 13, 2023	
72	MF	(Canada) Jordan Faria	(Canada) Toronto FC II	Short term loan	May 20, 2023	
90	GK	(Canada) Luka Gavran	(Canada) Toronto FC II	Short term loans (June 21, June 24, July 1)	June 21, 2023	
76	DF	(Canada) Lazar Stefanovic	(Canada) Toronto FC II	Short term loans (July 1, July 30)	July 1, 2023	
73	MF	(Honduras) Jesús Batiz	(Canada) Toronto FC II	Short term loans (July 4, July 8, July 30)	July 4, 2023	
51	DF	(Canada) Adam Pearlman	(Canada) Toronto FC II	Short term loans (July 4, July 8, August 30, October 7)	July 4, 2023	
5	MF	(Argentina) Franco Ibarra	(United States) Atlanta United FC	Six month loan, sent $50,000 GAM to Atlanta	July 10, 2023	
82	MF	(Canada) Julian Altobelli	(Canada) Toronto FC II	Short term loan	October 4, 2023	

==== MLS SuperDraft picks ====
2023 Toronto FC SuperDraft Picks
Round	Selection	Player	Position	College	Status
2	32	(Canada) Jalen Watson	Defender	Penn State Nittany Lions	Signed with Toronto FC II
3	61	(United States) Charlie Sharp	Forward	Western Michigan Broncos	

=== Out ===
==== Transferred out ====
No.	Pos.	Player	To	Fee/notes	Date	Source
38	LB	(Canada) Luca Petrasso	(United States) Orlando City SC	Traded for $300,000 GAM and $100,000 conditional GAM	November 9, 2022	
16	GK	(United States) Quentin Westberg	(United States) Atlanta United FC	Contract expired	November 15, 2022	
25	GK	(United States) Alex Bono	(United States) D.C. United	Contract expired	November 15, 2022	
15	CB	(Canada) Doneil Henry	(United States) Minnesota United FC	Contract expired	November 15, 2022	
14	MF	(Canada) Noble Okello	(United States) New England Revolution II	Contract expired	November 15, 2022	
23	CB	(Democratic Republic of the Congo) Chris Mavinga	(United States) LA Galaxy	Option declined	November 15, 2022	
96	RB	(Brazil) Auro Jr.	(Kazakhstan) FC Ordabasy	Option declined	November 15, 2022	
99	FW	(Nigeria) Ifunanyachi Achara	(United States) Houston Dynamo FC	Option declined	November 15, 2022	
22	LW	(Canada) Jacob Shaffelburg	(United States) Nashville SC	Purchase option exercised	November 15, 2022	
44	LB	(Italy) Domenico Criscito	(Italy) Genoa	Announced retirement	November 15, 2022	
11	MF	(Canada) Jayden Nelson	(Norway) Rosenborg	Transfer	February 8, 2023	
9	FW	(Spain) Jesús Jiménez	(United States) FC Dallas	Traded for Brandon Servania	February 20, 2023	
12	DF	(Canada) Kadin Chung	(Canada) Vancouver FC	Mutual Termination	February 28, 2023	
5	DF	(Canada) Lukas MacNaughton	(United States) Nashville SC	Traded to Nashville for C. J. Sapong	April 25, 2023	
14	MF	(Canada) Mark-Anthony Kaye	(United States) New England Revolution	Traded to New England for Latif Blessing and an international roster slot	July 13, 2023	
2	DF	(United States) Matt Hedges	(United States) Austin FC	Traded in exchange for $375,000 in 2024 GAM and up to an additional conditional $100,000 in 2025 GAM	July 26, 2023	

==== Loaned out ====
No.	Pos.	Player	To	Fee/notes	Date	Source
26	DF	(Trinidad and Tobago) Luke Singh	(Canada) Atlético Ottawa	One-year loan	March 2, 2023	
20	FW	(Canada) Ayo Akinola	(United States) San Jose Earthquakes	Loan until December 2023 with Purchase Option; TFC receives International roster slot	July 25, 2023	
77	FW	(Canada) Jordan Perruzza	(Canada) HFX Wanderers FC	Loan until December 2023	August 7, 2023	
47	MF	(Canada) Kosi Thompson	(Norway) Lillestrøm SK	Loan until December 2023 with purchase option	August 29, 2023	

== Pre-season ==
=== Matches ===
January 22 Scrimmage	Tijuana	–	Toronto FC	San Diego, California
		Report		Stadium: University of California, San Diego
Note: Closed-door, Details agreed to not be released

January 27 Friendly	San Jose Earthquakes	1–0	Toronto FC	Irvine, California
	Richmond	Report		Stadium: Orange County Great Park; Attendance: 0
Note: Closed-door friendly

February 8 Coachella Valley Inv.	Vancouver Whitecaps FC	3–0	Toronto FC	Indio, California
	Dájome 67' (pen.), 77'; Brown 75'	Report		Stadium: Empire Polo Club

February 11 Coachella Valley Inv.	Los Angeles FC	2–1	Toronto FC	Indio, California
	Bouanga	Report	Vázquez	Stadium: Empire Polo Club

February 15 Coachella Valley Inv.	Portland Timbers	2–2	Toronto FC	Indio, California
	Nathan 68'; Evander		Bernardeschi 2' (pen.); Osorio 34'	Stadium: Empire Polo Club

February 18 Friendly	LA Galaxy	2–1	Toronto FC	Carson, California
	Álvarez 27'; Delgado 52'	Report	Akinola 89'	Stadium: Dignity Health Sports Park; Referee: Ramy Touchan

== Competitions ==
=== Major League Soccer ===
==== League tables ====
Eastern Conference

MLS Eastern Conference table (2023)
Pos	Team	Pld	Pts
11	New York City FC	34	41
12	D.C. United	34	40
13	Chicago Fire FC	34	40
14	Inter Miami CF	34	34
15	Toronto FC	34	22

Source: MLS

Overall

Overall MLS standings table
Pos	Team	Pld	Pts
25	Austin FC	34	39
26	LA Galaxy	34	36
27	Inter Miami CF (L)	34	34
28	Colorado Rapids	34	27
29	Toronto FC	34	22

Source: MLS
(L) Leagues Cup winner

==== Matches ====
February 25 1	D.C. United	3–2	Toronto FC	Washington, D.C.
7:30 PM	Klich 13'; Canouse (yellow card) 56'; Benteke (yellow card) 60', (goal) 90'; Ku-DiPietro 90+8'	Report	Bernardeschi 66' (pen.), (yellow card) 79'; Kaye 83'; Laryea (yellow card) 85'	Stadium: Audi Field; Attendance: 17,397; Referee: Ted Unkel

March 4 2	Atlanta United FC	1–1	Toronto FC	Atlanta, Georgia
7:30 PM	Ibarra (yellow card) 56'; Rossetto 60'; Etienne (yellow card) 64'	Report	Bernardeschi 52'	Stadium: Mercedes-Benz Stadium; Attendance: 42,817; Referee: Nima Saghafi

March 11 3	Toronto FC	1–1	Columbus Crew	Toronto, Ontario
7:30 PM	Kerr 25'; Kaye (yellow card) 60'; Hedges (yellow card) 80'	Report	Quinton (yellow card) 32'; Morris (yellow card) 66'; Medranda 75'	Stadium: BMO Field; Attendance: 25,796; Referee: Ismir Pekmic

March 18 4	Toronto FC	2–0	Inter Miami CF	Toronto, Ontario
7:30 PM	Bradley (yellow card) 15'; Osorio 48'; Laryea (yellow card) 49'; Kaye 69'	Report	Taylor (yellow card) 83'	Stadium: BMO Field; Attendance: 20,701; Referee: Alex Chilowicz

March 25 5	San Jose Earthquakes	0–0	Toronto FC	San Jose, California
10:30 PM	Marie (yellow card) 30'	Report	Bernardeschi (yellow card) 77'	Stadium: PayPal Park; Attendance: 12,434; Referee: Fotis Bazakos

April 1 6	Toronto FC	2–2	Charlotte FC	Toronto, Ontario
7:30 PM	Bernardeschi 6'; Rosted (yellow card) 11'; Hedges (yellow card) 41'; Bradley 44'; Bernardeschi (yellow card) 67'	Report	Bender 51'; Jóźwiak 70'; Copetti (yellow card) 90+2'; Hegardt (yellow card) 90+3'	Stadium: BMO Field; Attendance: 22,801; Referee: Ramy Touchan

April 8 7	Nashville SC	0–0	Toronto FC	Nashville, Tennessee
8:30 PM	Picault (yellow card) 34'; Lovitz (yellow card) 80'	Report	Petretta (yellow card) 37'; Osorio (yellow card) 44'	Stadium: Geodis Park; Attendance: 26,999; Referee: Guido Gonzales Jr.

April 15 8	Toronto FC	2–2	Atlanta United FC	Toronto, Ontario
7:30 PM	Laryea 43'; Bernardeschi (yellow card) 63'; Servania 90+4'	Report	Giakoumakis 4'; Chol 76'; Chol (yellow card) 77'	Stadium: BMO Field; Attendance: 27,892; Referee: Ted Unkel

April 22 9	Philadelphia Union	4–2	Toronto FC	Chester, Pennsylvania
7:30 PM	MacNaughton 16' (o.g.); Uhre 20', 43', 56'; Elliott (yellow card) 36'; Carranza (yellow card) 63'	Report	Insigne (yellow card) 45+1', (goal) 66'; Laryea 90+2'	Stadium: Subaru Park; Attendance: 18,533; Referee: Alex Chilowicz

April 29 10	Toronto FC	1–0	New York City FC	Toronto, Ontario
7:30 PM	Sapong 46'; Laryea (yellow card) 65'; Hedges (yellow card) 72'; Johnson (yellow card) 80'	Report	Parks (yellow card) 54'	Stadium: BMO Field; Attendance: 21,847; Referee: Armando Villarreal

May 6 11	Toronto FC	0–2	New England Revolution	Toronto, Ontario
7:30 PM	Franklin (yellow card) 11'; Coello Camarero (yellow card) 40'; Laryea (yellow card) 50'	Report	Wood 19'; Jones 62'	Stadium: BMO Field; Attendance: 27,438; Referee: Fotis Bazakos

May 13 12	CF Montréal	2–0	Toronto FC	Montreal, Quebec
7:30 PM	Campbell (yellow card) 6'; Thorkelsson (yellow card) 24'; Herrera (yellow card) 40'; Lappalainen 53'; Offor 68'	Report	Marshall-Rutty (yellow card) 26' (yellow-red card) 56'	Stadium: Saputo Stadium; Attendance: 19,619; Referee: Chris Penso

May 17 13	Toronto FC	0–0	New York Red Bulls	Toronto, Ontario
7:30 PM		Report	Manoel (yellow card) 45'; Stroud (yellow card) 75'; Barlow (yellow card) 89'	Stadium: BMO Field; Attendance: 22,560; Referee: Guido Gonzales Jr.

May 20 14	Austin FC	1–0	Toronto FC	Austin, Texas
8:30 PM	Pereira (yellow card) 28'; Finlay (yellow card) 37'; Ring (yellow card) 75'; Djeffal (yellow card) 79'; Zardes 90+1'	Report	Servania (yellow card) 35'; Franklin (yellow card) 53'; Kaye (yellow card) 71'	Stadium: Q2 Stadium; Attendance: 20,738; Referee: Ismir Pekmic

May 27 15	Toronto FC	2–1	D.C. United	Toronto, Ontario
7:30 PM	Kerr 14'; Kaye (yellow card) 45+2'; Thompson 72'; Marshall-Rutty (yellow card) 90+5'	Report	Pedro Santos (yellow card) 69'; Benteke 87'	Stadium: BMO Field; Attendance: 27,065; Referee: Lukasz Szpala

May 31 16	Toronto FC	0–0	Chicago Fire	Toronto, Ontario
7:30 PM	Kaye (yellow card) 45+3'	Report	Navarro (yellow card) 33'	Stadium: BMO Field; Attendance: 22,778; Referee: Nima Saghafi

June 3 17	Minnesota United FC	1–1	Toronto FC	Saint Paul, Minnesota
8:30 PM	Trapp (yellow card) 31'; Arriaga 89'	Report	Insigne 58'; Servania (yellow card) 90'	Stadium: Allianz Field; Attendance: 19,743; Referee: Ramy Touchan

June 10 18	Toronto FC	1–1	Nashville SC	Toronto, Ontario
7:30 PM	Insigne 38'; Mabika (yellow card) 72'	Report	Bauer (yellow card) 35'; Leal 69'	Stadium: BMO Field; Attendance: 27,228; Referee: Jon Freemon

June 21 19	FC Cincinnati	3–0	Toronto FC	Cincinnati, Ohio
7:30 PM	Nwobodo (yellow card) 19'; Arias 35'; Gaddis (yellow card) 41'; Acosta 54'; Badji 63'; Halsey (yellow card) 82'	Report	Petretta (yellow card) 25'; Bernardeschi (yellow card) 41'	Stadium: TQL Stadium; Attendance: 25,513; Referee: Mark Allatin

June 24 20	New England Revolution	2–1	Toronto FC	Foxborough, Massachusetts
7:30 PM	Wood 33'; Vrioni 52'	Report	Kerr 11'	Stadium: Gillette Stadium; Attendance: 24,596; Referee: Ted Unkel

July 1 21	Toronto FC	0–1	Real Salt Lake	Toronto, Ontario
7:30 PM	Mabika (yellow card) 21'	Report	Paul (yellow card) 86'; Julio 90+2'	Stadium: BMO Field; Attendance: 26,694; Referee: Marcos de Oliveira

July 4 22	Orlando City SC	4–0	Toronto FC	Orlando, Florida
7:30 PM	Araújo 16'; McGuire 22'; Gallese (yellow card) 62'; Thórhallsson 77'; Kara 84'	Report	Coello (yellow card) 45+1'; Bernardeschi (yellow card) 47' (yellow-red card) 62'; Petretta (yellow card) 80'	Stadium: Exploria Stadium; Attendance: 17,604; Referee: Guido Gonzales Jr.

July 8 23	Toronto FC	0–1	St. Louis City SC	Toronto, Ontario
7:30 PM	Antonoglou (yellow card) 90+4'	Report	Blom (yellow card) 38'; Parker (yellow card) 47'; Jackson 50'	Stadium: BMO Field; Attendance: 26,156; Referee: Filip Dujic

July 15 24	Chicago Fire FC	1–0	Toronto FC	Chicago, Illinois
8:30 PM	Czichos (yellow card) 76'; Przybyłko 90'	Report	Petretta (yellow card) 55'	Stadium: Soldier Field; Attendance: 18,246; Referee: Serhiy Boyko

August 20 25	Toronto FC	2–3	CF Montréal	Toronto, Ontario
7:30 PM	Servania (yellow card) 45+5'; Bernardeschi 66', 90+4'; Petretta (red card) 77'	Report	Choinière 18', 79' (pen.); Mabika 25' (o.g.); Campbell (yellow card) 90+3'	Stadium: BMO Field; Attendance: 27,518; Referee: Joe Dickerson

August 26 26	Columbus Crew	2–0	Toronto FC	Columbus, Ohio
7:30 PM	Rossi 21'; Amundsen (yellow card) 24'; Russell-Rowe 89'	Report	O'Neill (yellow card) 44'	Stadium: Lower.com Field; Attendance: 20,548; Referee: Elton García

August 30 27	Toronto FC	3–1	Philadelphia Union	Toronto, Ontario
7:30 PM	Insigne 23', (yellow card) 90+3'; Kerr 58'; Osorio 63'; Ibarra (yellow card) 76'; Romero (yellow card) 87'; Vázquez (yellow card) 90+6'	Report	Carranza 45'; Glesnes (yellow card) 90+1'; Martínez (yellow card) 90+4'; Bueno (red card) 90+7'	Stadium: BMO Field; Attendance: 25,410; Referee: Mark Allatin

September 16 28	Toronto FC	1–2	Vancouver Whitecaps FC	Toronto, Ontario
7:30 PM	Kerr 50'; Petretta (yellow card) 76'	Report	Berhalter (yellow card) 32'; Blackmon 56'; Vite (yellow card) 60'; White 66'; Brown (yellow card) 87'	Stadium: BMO Field; Attendance: 26,165; Referee: Ramy Touchan

September 20 29	Inter Miami CF	4–0	Toronto FC	Fort Lauderdale, Florida
7:30 PM	Farías 45+3'; Taylor 54', 87'; Cremaschi 73'	Report		Stadium: DRV PNK Stadium; Attendance: 19,659; Referee: Drew Fischer

September 24 30	New York City FC	3–0	Toronto FC	Harrison, New Jersey
1:00 PM	Perea 2'; Bakrar (penalty missed) 31'; Jasson 45+4'; Fernández 54', (yellow card) 90+2'	Report	O'Neill (yellow card) 30'	Stadium: Red Bull Arena; Attendance: 7,417; Referee: Serhiy Boyko
Note: Match postponed from September 23 due to water main break at Red Bull Arena.

September 30 31	Toronto FC	2–3	FC Cincinnati	Toronto, Ontario
7:30 PM	Osorio 39', 44'; Antonoglou (yellow card) 74'; Owusu (yellow card) 86'	Report	Vázquez 28', 35'; Boupendza 72'	Stadium: BMO Field; Attendance: 24,658; Referee: Alex Chilowicz

October 4 32	Charlotte FC	3–0	Toronto FC	Charlotte, North Carolina
7:30 PM	Świderski 8' (pen.), 45+2' (pen.); Dejaegere 56'	Report	Bradley (yellow card) 26'; Mbongue (yellow card) 45+6'	Stadium: Bank of America Stadium; Attendance: 30,080; Referee: Malik Badawi

October 7 33	New York Red Bulls	3–0	Toronto FC	Harrison, New Jersey
7:30 PM	Barlow 45'; Luquinhas 48', 65'	Report		Stadium: Red Bull Arena; Attendance: 24,506; Referee: Ricardo Fierro

October 21 34	Toronto FC	0–2	Orlando City SC	Toronto, Ontario
6:20 PM		Report	McGuire 63', 74'	Stadium: BMO Field; Attendance: 27,556; Referee: Mathieu Souaré
Note: Match postponed by 20 minutes due to transportation issues.

=== Canadian Championship ===
May 9 Quarter-finals	Toronto FC	1–2	CF Montréal	Toronto, Ontario
7:00 PM	Insigne 44'; Sapong (yellow card) 47'	Report	Offor (yellow card) 26', (goal) 39'; Brault-Guillard 35'; Sirois (yellow card) 89'; Herrera (yellow card) 90+5'	Stadium: BMO Field; Attendance: 17,726; Referee: Yusri Rudolf

=== Leagues Cup ===
==== Group stage ====
East 3

Pos	Team	Pld	W	PW	PL	L	GF	GA	GD	Pts	Qualification	ATL	NYC	TOR
1	(Mexico) Atlas	2	2	0	0	0	2	0	+2	6	Advance to knockout stage	—	—	1–0
2	(United States) New York City FC	2	1	0	0	1	5	1	+4	3	Advance to knockout stage	0–1	—	5–0
3	(Canada) Toronto FC	2	0	0	0	2	0	6	−6	0		—	—	—

Source: Leagues Cup
Rules for classification: Tiebreakers

July 26 1	New York City FC (United States)	5–0	(Canada) Toronto FC	Harrison, New Jersey
7:30 PM	Chanot 30'; Bakrar 45'; Rodríguez 45+2', 75'; Jasson 56'; Gray (yellow card) 90'	Report	O'Neill (yellow card) 38' (yellow-red card) 84'; Mabika (yellow card) 90'	Stadium: Red Bull Arena; Attendance: 7,417; Referee: Guillermo Pacheco (Mexico)

July 30 2	Atlas (Mexico)	1–0	(Canada) Toronto FC	Toronto, Ontario
7:30 PM	Caicedo 2'; Rocha (yellow card) 35'	Report	Thompson (yellow card) 59'	Stadium: BMO Field; Attendance: 24,633; Referee: Nima Saghafi (United States)

=== Competitions summary ===
Competition	Record								First Match	Last Match	Final Position
Competition	G	W	D	L	GF	GA	GD	Win %	First Match	Last Match	Final Position
MLS Regular Season	34	4	10	20	26	59	−33	11.76	February 25	October 21	15th in Eastern Conference, 29th Overall
Canadian Championship	1	0	0	1	1	2	−1	0.00	May 9		Quarter-finals
Leagues Cup	2	0	0	2	0	6	−6	0.00	July 26	July 30	Group stage
Total	37	4	10	23	27	67	−40	10.81			

Source: Competitions

== Statistics ==
=== Goals ===
Rank	Nation	Player	Major League Soccer	Canadian Championship	Leagues Cup	Total
1	(Italy)	Federico Bernardeschi	5	0	0	5
1	(Italy)	Lorenzo Insigne	4	1	0	5
1	(Canada)	Deandre Kerr	5	0	0	5
4	(Canada)	Jonathan Osorio	4	0	0	4
5	(Canada)	Mark-Anthony Kaye	2	0	—	2
5	(Canada)	Richie Laryea	2	0	—	2
7	(United States)	Michael Bradley	1	0	0	1
7	(United States)	C.J. Sapong	1	0	0	1
7	(United States)	Brandon Servania	1	0	0	1
7	(Canada)	Kosi Thompson	1	0	0	1
Own goals			0	0	0	0
Totals			26	1	0	27

Updated to match played September 30, 2023
Source: Toronto FC Stats

No longer on roster
Out on loan for remainder of the season

=== Shutouts ===
Rank	Nation	Player	Pos.	Major League Soccer	Canadian Championship	Leagues Cup	Total
1	(United States)	Sean Johnson	GK	6	0	0	6
Totals				6	0	0	6

Updated to match played May 31, 2023

== Honours ==
=== MLS Team of the Matchday ===
Matchday	Starters	Bench	Coach	Ref.
2	—	(United States) Sean Johnson	—	
4	(Canada) Richie Laryea	(Italy) Federico Bernardeschi	—	
5	(Canada) Jahkeele Marshall-Rutty	—	—	
6	—	(Italy) Federico Bernardeschi	—	
7	—	(Canada) Mark-Anthony Kaye	—	
8	(Canada) Richie Laryea	—	—	
9	—	(Canada) Jonathan Osorio	—	
10	(Canada) Richie Laryea	(United States) C.J. Sapong	—	
13	—	(Canada) Richie Laryea	—	
15	(Italy) Lorenzo Insigne	—	—	
17	(Canada) Richie Laryea	—	—	
27	(Italy) Federico Bernardeschi	—	—	
29	(Canada) Deandre Kerr	(Spain) Alonso Coello (Italy) Lorenzo Insigne	—	
35	—	(Canada) Jonathan Osorio	—	

=== MLS Goal of the Matchday ===
Matchday	Player	Opponent	Ref.
6	(Italy) Federico Bernardeschi	Charlotte FC	
