= Ife Adenuga =

Canadian soccer player (born 2003)

- Adenuga with Toronto FC II

Personal information
- Full name: Ifeoluwa Tomilayo Adenuga
- Date of birth: February 17, 2003 (age 23)
- Place of birth: Toronto, Canada
- Height: 6 ft 1 in (1.85 m)
- Position: Midfielder

Team information
- Current team: Toronto Varsity Blues
- Number: 18

Youth career
- Brampton YSC
- 2015–2019: Toronto FC
- Vaughan Azzurri
- 2022: SC Fortuna Köln

College career
| Years | Team | Apps | (Gls) |
| 2023– | Toronto Varsity Blues | 19 | (1) |

Senior career*
| Years | Team | Apps | (Gls) |
| 2018 | Toronto FC III | 1 | (0) |
| 2023 | Sigma FC | 1 | (0) |
| 2023 | Toronto FC II | 6 | (1) |
| 2024 | Sigma FC | 6 | (0) |
| 2024 | Alliance United | 13 | (0) |
- * Club domestic league appearances and goals as of August 7, 2025

Ifeoluwa Tomilayo Adenuga (born February 17, 2003) is a Canadian soccer player who plays as a midfielder for the Toronto Varsity Blues.

== Early life ==
Born in Canada, Adenuga is of Nigerian descent. He began playing youth soccer with Brampton Youth SC. In February 2015, he joined the Toronto FC Academy, where he won the 2015 U12 Generation Adidas Cup and the 2019 U16 Dallas Cup. Afterwards, he joined Vaughan Azzurri. He later joined the youth system of German club SC Fortuna Köln.

== University career ==
In November 2020, he committed to Syracuse University to join the men's soccer team in 2021, but did not ultimately attend, instead joining the youth system of German club SC Fortuna Köln.

In 2023, he began attending the University of Toronto, playing for the men's soccer team.

== Club career ==
In 2018, he appeared for Toronto FC III in a single match in League1 Ontario.

In 2023, he joined Sigma FC in League1 Ontario.

In June 2023, he signed a short-term contract with Toronto FC II in MLS Next Pro, with the team retaining options to extend the contract for the remainder of the 2023 season, as well as the 2024 season. On July 16, he scored his first goal for the club against Huntsville City FC.

== Career statistics ==
As of August 25, 2023

| Club | Season | League | | | Playoffs | | Domestic Cup | | Other | | Total | |
| Club | Season | Division | Apps | Goals | Apps | Goals | Apps | Goals | Apps | Goals | Apps | Goals |
|---|---|---|---|---|---|---|---|---|---|---|---|---|
| Toronto FC III | 2018 | League1 Ontario | 1 | 0 | — | | — | | 0 | 0 | 1 | 0 |
| Sigma FC | 2023 | League1 Ontario | 1 | 0 | — | | — | | — | | 1 | 0 |
| Toronto FC II | 2023 | MLS Next Pro | 6 | 1 | — | | — | | — | | 6 | 1 |
| Sigma FC | 2024 | League1 Ontario Premier | 6 | 0 | — | | — | | 0 | 0 | 6 | 0 |
| Alliance United FC | 2024 | League1 Ontario Premier | 13 | 0 | — | | — | | — | | 13 | 0 |
| Career total | | | 27 | 1 | 0 | 0 | 0 | 0 | 0 | 0 | 27 | 1 |
