= Luka Gavran =

Canadian soccer player (born 2000)

- Gavran with Toronto FC II in 2023

Personal information
- Full name: Luka Robert Gavran
- Date of birth: May 9, 2000 (age 26)
- Place of birth: Hamilton, Ontario, Canada
- Height: 6 ft 5 in (1.96 m)
- Position: Goalkeeper

Team information
- Current team: Toronto FC
- Number: 1

Youth career
- Hamilton Croatia SC
- Dinamo Zagreb
- GPS Academy

College career
Years	Team	Apps	(Gls)
2019–2021	St. John's Red Storm	48	(0)

Senior career*
Years	Team	Apps	(Gls)
2021	Manhattan SC	0	(0)
2022–2023	Toronto FC II	35	(0)
2023	→ Toronto FC (loan)	0	(0)
2023–	Toronto FC	49	(1)
2023	→ Toronto FC II (loan)	1	(0)

International career^{‡}
2026	Canada B	1	(0)
- * Club domestic league appearances and goals as of November 1, 2026 ‡ National team caps and goals as of January 17, 2026

Luka Robert Gavran (born May 9, 2000) is a Canadian professional soccer player who plays as a goalkeeper for Toronto FC in Major League Soccer.

== Early life ==
Born in Hamilton, Ontario, Gavran started playing youth soccer at age six with Hamilton Croatia SC, initially playing as a striker, switching to goalkeeper when he was 13. He also spent some time in the Dinamo Zagreb youth development system. Afterwards, he joined GPS Academy. With GPS he won a Vase Cup title in Northern Ireland in 2017 and was the Ontario Academy Soccer League Goalie of the Year.

== College career ==
In 2018, he received a scholarship to St. John's University to play for the men's soccer team. He redshirted his first year in 2018. He made his debut on August 30, 2019 against the Appalachian State Mountaineers. After splitting time in net during his first two seasons, he became the full-time starter during his junior year in 2021, leading the country in shutouts and save percentage. In September 2021, he earned back-to-back Big East Goalkeeper of the Week honours. In 2021, he was named Big East Goalkeeper of the Year, a College Soccer News Second Team All-American, and a United Soccer Coaches Third-team All-American.

== Club career ==
In 2021, he was on the roster for Manhattan SC in USL League Two, but did not appear in any matches.

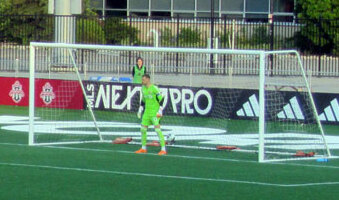
Luka Gavran playing for Toronto FC II in 2023

In 2022, he was selected in the 2nd round (31st overall) in the 2022 MLS SuperDraft by Toronto FC. After attending pre-season with Toronto FC, in March 2022, he signed a professional contract with the second team, Toronto FC II, in MLS Next Pro. He made his debut on April 3 against FC Cincinnati 2. He was named MLS Next Pro Goalkeeper of the Month for July 2022. In August 2022, he was named as a competitor for the MLS All-Stars Skills Challenge ahead of the 2022 MLS All-Star Game. On June 21, 2023, he signed a short-term loan with the Toronto FC first team. He signed a second short term loan a few days later on June 24.

In August 2023, he signed a contract with the Toronto FC first team for the remainder of the 2023 season, with club options for 2024 and 2025. His signing came via the MLS Extreme Hardship rule as Toronto had fewer than two available goalkeepers. He later re-joined the second team on loan for some matches. He made his Major League Soccer debut for the first team on September 24, 2023 in a loss against New York City FC, where he saved a penalty kick during the match. He recorded his first clean sheets in March 2024, posting shutouts against Charlotte FC and Atlanta United FC. In January 2025, he extended his contract through the 2027 season, with an option for 2028. On April 22, 2026, Gavran scored against Philadelphia Union in stoppage time to secure a 3–3 home draw; with his goal, he became the third goalkeeper in league history to do so.

== International career ==
In June 2025, Gavran was called up to the Canada squad for the 2025 Canadian Shield friendly tournament. He appeared in a match against Guatemala in January 2026, in his first senior appearance; however, as it was designated a B-level friendly, it did not count as an official senior cap.

== Career statistics ==
As of match played November 1, 2026

Appearances and goals by club, season and competition
Club	Season	League			Playoffs		Canadian Championship		Other		Total	
Club	Season	Division	Apps	Goals	Apps	Goals	Apps	Goals	Apps	Goals	Apps	Goals
Toronto FC II	2022	MLS Next Pro	18	0	2	0	—		—		20	0
Toronto FC II	2023	MLS Next Pro	18	0	—		—		—		18	0
Toronto FC II	Total		36	0	2	0	0	0	0	0	38	0
Toronto FC	2023	Major League Soccer	4	0	—		0	0	0	0	4	0
Toronto FC	2024	Major League Soccer	9	0	—		4	0	0	0	13	0
Toronto FC	2025	Major League Soccer	3	0	—		1	0	—		4	0
Toronto FC	2026	Major League Soccer	33	1	—		1	0	—		34	1
Toronto FC	Total		49	1	0	0	6	0	0	0	55	1
Career total			87	1	2	0	6	0	0	0	93	1
