= Themi Antonoglou =

Canadian soccer player (born 2001)

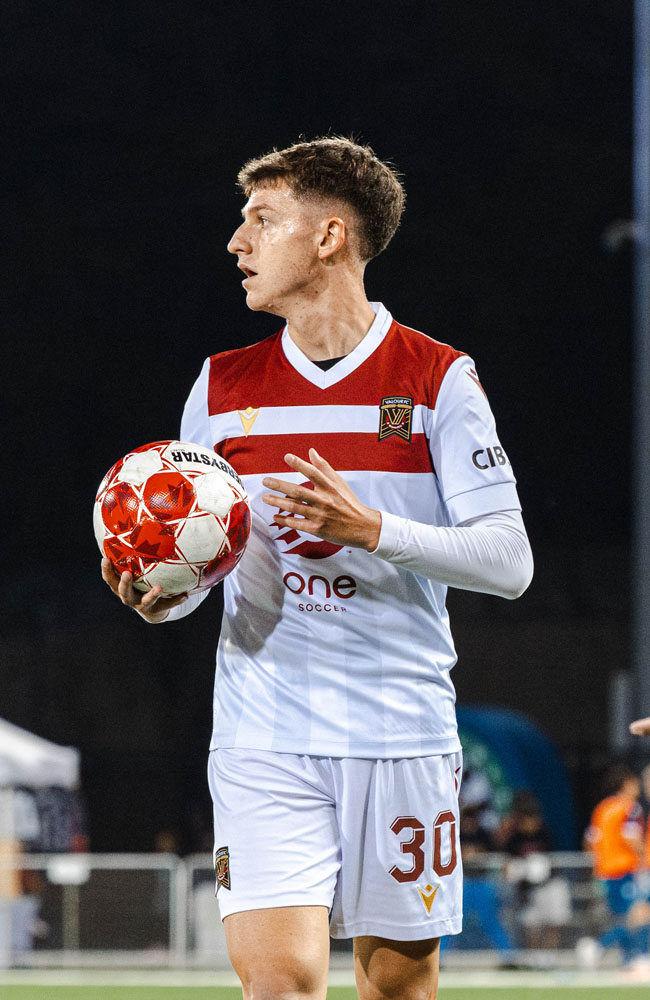
- Antonoglou playing for Valour FC in 2024.

Personal information
- Date of birth: June 2, 2001 (age 25)
- Place of birth: Toronto, Ontario, Canada
- Height: 1.75 m (5 ft 9 in)
- Positions: Defender; midfielder

Team information
- Current team: Las Vegas Lights FC
- Number: 81

Youth career
- West Toronto SC
- 2015–2021: Toronto FC

Senior career*
Years	Team	Apps	(Gls)
2018	Toronto FC III	1	(0)
2019–2022	Toronto FC II	25	(4)
2022	→ Toronto FC (loan)	1	(0)
2022–2023	Toronto FC	12	(0)
2022–2023	→ Toronto FC II (loan)	31	(4)
2024–2025	Valour FC	53	(3)
2026–	Las Vegas Lights FC	28	(1)
- * Club domestic league appearances and goals as of 10:24, 9 November 2026 (UTC)

Themi Antonoglou (born June 2, 2001) is a Canadian soccer player who plays for USL Championship side Las Vegas Lights FC.

== Early life ==
Antonoglou began his youth career with West Toronto SC, where he was scouted by Toronto FC Academy coach Danny Dichio, and joined the academy in January 2015. He is of Greek descent.

== Club career ==
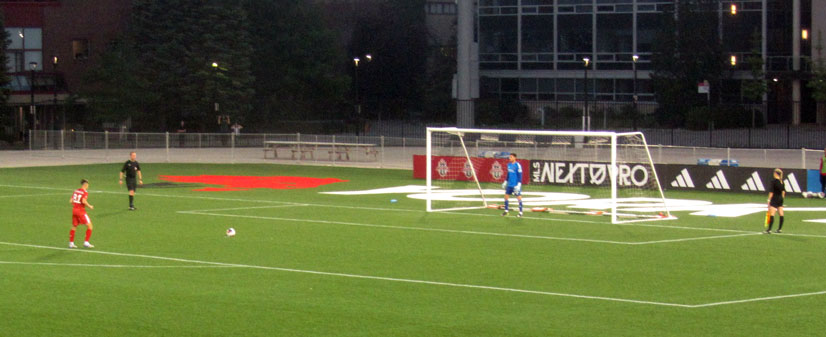
Antonoglou takes a penalty kick in 2023 for Toronto FC II

While with Toronto FC Academy, he debuted for the senior academy team, Toronto FC III in League1 Ontario on September 18, 2018 against Vaughan Azzurri. He made his debut at the professional level with Toronto FC II in USL League One in 2019 against the Richmond Kickers. He officially joined Toronto FC II, signing his first professional contract in July 2020. After recording his first professional assist on May 22 against North Texas SC, he scored his first professional goal on May 26 against FC Tucson. On April 15, 2022, he signed a short-term four-day loan with the first team, Toronto FC, ahead of their Major League Soccer match against the Philadelphia Union, but was an unused substitute. He signed additional short-term loans on April 23, April 29, and May 4. and made his first appearance for Toronto FC on April 24, 2022 against New York City FC, in a substitute appearance. He signed a permanent contract with Toronto FC on May 7. He was later loaned back to the second team on May 14. With the second team, he scored a brace in the Conference Finals on October 2, against Columbus Crew, first scoring a free kick in the final seconds of second half injury time to tie the game, and then scored a goal from the midfield line in extra time, although Toronto FC II ultimately was defeated 3-2. In 2023, he was again loaned to the second team. At the end of the 2023 season, the club declined his option for the 2024 season.

In February 2024, he signed with Canadian Premier League club Valour FC. He made his debut on April 14 against Vancouver FC. He scored his first goal for the club on July 28, 2024, in a 3-0 victory over Pacific FC. In 2024, he led the league in assists and was nominated for the CPL Defender of the Year award. In addition, he was named to the CPL Best XI for 2024. After the season, the club picked up his option for the 2025 season.

On February 3 2026, Las Vegas Lights FC announced they had signed Antonoglou to a contract for the 2026 USL Championship season.

== Career statistics ==
As of match played June 21, 2026

Club	Season	League			Playoffs		National Cup		Continental		Other		Total	
Club	Season	Division	Apps	Goals	Apps	Goals	Apps	Goals	Apps	Goals	Apps	Goals	Apps	Goals
Toronto FC III	2018	League1 Ontario	1	0	–		–		–		0	0	1	0
Toronto FC II	2019	USL League One	2	0	–		–		–		–		2	0
Toronto FC II	2021	USL League One	19	3	–		–		–		–		19	3
Toronto FC II	2022	MLS Next Pro	4	1	0	0	–		–		–		4	1
Toronto FC II	Total		25	4	0	0	0	0	0	0	0	0	25	4
Toronto FC (loan)	2022	Major League Soccer	1	0	–		0	0	–		–		1	0
Toronto FC	2022	Major League Soccer	1	0	–		0	0	–		–		1	0
Toronto FC	2023	Major League Soccer	11	0	–		0	0	–		2 (Note: Appearances in Leagues Cup)	0	13	0
Toronto FC	Total		13	0	0	0	0	0	0	0	2	0	15	0
Toronto FC II (loan)	2022	MLS Next Pro	16	3	2	2	–		–		–		18	5
Toronto FC II (loan)	2023	MLS Next Pro	15	1	–		–		–		–		15	1
Toronto FC II (loan)	Total		31	4	2	2	0	0	0	0	0	0	33	6
Valour FC	2024	Canadian Premier League	27	1	–		1	0	–		–		28	1
Valour FC	2025	Canadian Premier League	26	2	–		3	0	–		–		29	2
Valour FC	Total		53	3	0	0	4	0	0	0	0	0	57	3
Las Vegas Lights FC	2026	USL Championship	13	0	0	0	0	0	0	0	2	0	15	0
Career total			136	11	2	2	4	0	0	0	4	0	146	13

== Honours ==
Toronto FC

- Canadian Championship: 2020
