= 2020 Canadian Championship =

Soccer tournament season

2020 Canadian Championship final
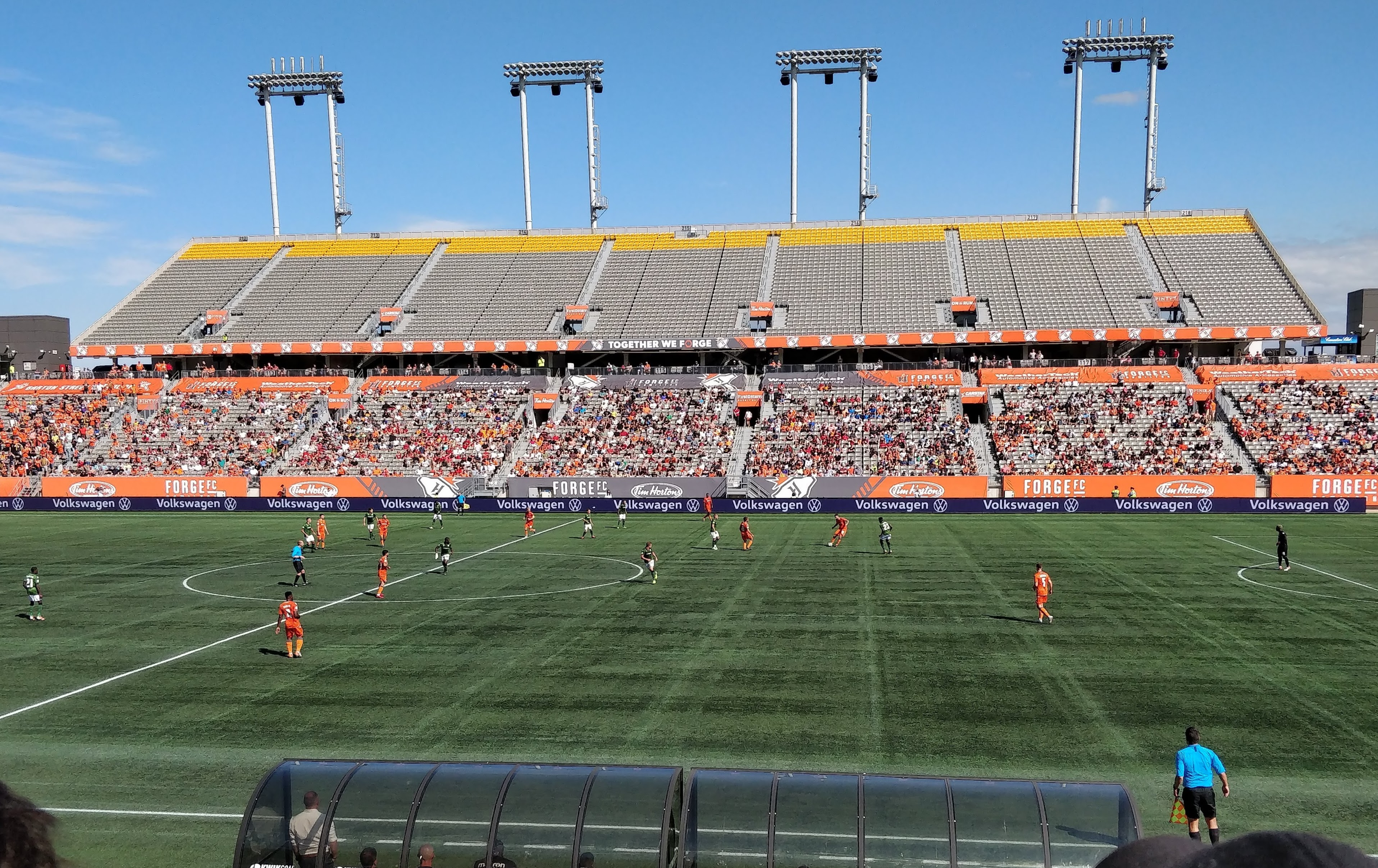
- Tim Hortons Field in Hamilton, Ontario, hosted the final match.
Forge FC	Toronto FC
1	1
- Toronto FC won 5–4 on penalties
- Date: June 4, 2022
- Venue: Tim Hortons Field, Hamilton, Ontario
- Man of the Match: Tristan Borges (Forge FC)
- Referee: Silviu Petrescu
- Attendance: 13,715

The 2020 Canadian Championship was the thirteenth edition of Canada's national soccer cup tournament, awarding the Voyageurs Cup. It was held as a final between one representative each from Major League Soccer and the Canadian Premier League. Before the COVID-19 pandemic, a larger knockout tournament was to be held from June 16 to September 24, 2020, between twelve teams.

The twelve teams originally planned to participate were the three MLS clubs, seven Canadian Premier League clubs, and the champions of League1 Ontario and Première ligue de soccer du Québec. The city of Ottawa had looked to be absent for the first time since 2013, with Ottawa Fury FC having suspended operations in late 2019, and Atlético Ottawa having joined the Canadian Premier League after the original draw had been finalized.

The final was held on June 4, 2022, at Tim Hortons Field in Hamilton, Ontario between hosts Forge FC and Toronto FC.

== Format ==
=== Original format ===
The format of the competition was originally changed slightly from the 2019 edition to accommodate the departure of Ottawa Fury FC. Each round of the four-round tournament would be played in a two-legged tie format. The League1 Ontario champion Master's FA, Première ligue de soccer du Québec champion A.S. Blainville, and six CPL clubs would enter in the qualifying round in June. They would be joined by the three Major League Soccer teams and the remaining CPL club (given bye as the furthest advancing club in the 2019 Canadian Championship) in the quarter-finals in July. The semi-finals would follow in August, and the finals would be in September. Atlético Ottawa were not included in the original format because they joined the CPL after the schedule was announced.

Due to the COVID-19 pandemic in Canada, all soccer events in the country were either postponed or cancelled, beginning in March 2020. Initially the tournament was delayed indefinitely and then in June, the format was adjusted to exclude the League1 Ontario and Première ligue de soccer du Québec 2019 champions because those leagues would not hold full seasons in 2020. Atlético Ottawa's inclusion was also confirmed at this time.

=== Revised format ===
On August 13, 2020, the Canadian Soccer Association (CSA) announced that the tournament would consist solely of a single match final to be held between the winner of the head-to-head series between Canadian teams from Major League Soccer and the champion of the Canadian Premier League. On November 25, 2020, the CSA announced that due to pandemic-related travel restriction and scheduling conflicts, the final would be scheduled for the first quarter of 2021. During the fourth quarter of 2020, Toronto FC had been playing in the 2020 MLS Cup Playoffs in the United States, while Forge FC had been competing in the 2020 CONCACAF League across several locations in Central America and the Caribbean.

In early March 2021, several outlets reported that the final would be played on March 20, 2021. The winner of the Canadian Championship final would qualify for the 2021 CONCACAF Champions League which begins in early April 2021. Forge FC owner Bob Young raised concerns over the date of the final noting that as of March 6, 2021, his club had not yet been granted permission to train by local health authorities. On March 8, Toronto FC – who had been training as a team since February 17 – announced that several members of their team had tested positive for COVID-19 and that they had halted training.

On March 11, 2021, it was announced that the final would be postponed beyond March and that Toronto FC would automatically qualify for the Champions League. On March 2, 2022, the match was set for June 4 at Tim Hortons Field in Hamilton.

== Qualification ==
=== Major League Soccer ===
As part of the MLS regular season, Canada's three Major League Soccer clubs played each other three times from August 18 to September 16. The team with the most points from this series, Toronto FC, qualified for the Canadian Championship.

Pos	Team	Pld	W	D	L	GF	GA	GD	Pts	Qualification
**1**	Toronto FC	**6**	**4**	**0**	**2**	**9**	**5**	**+4**	**12**	**Qualification for the 2020 Canadian Championship and the 2021 CONCACAF Champions League**
2	Montreal Impact	6	3	0	3	9	8	+1	**9**	
3	Vancouver Whitecaps FC	6	2	0	4	8	13	−5	**6**	

Source: MLS
Rules for classification: 1) points; 2) total wins; 3) goal differential; 4) goals for; 5) away goal differential; 6) away goals for; 7) home goal differential; 8) home goals for 9) coin toss or drawing of lots.

Fixtures
Date	Home team	Result	Away team
Aug 18, 2020	Toronto FC	3–0	Vancouver Whitecaps FC
Aug 21, 2020	Toronto FC	1–0	Vancouver Whitecaps FC
Aug 25, 2020	Montreal Impact	2–0	Vancouver Whitecaps FC
Aug 28, 2020	Montreal Impact	0–1	Toronto FC
Sep 1, 2020	Toronto FC	0–1	Montreal Impact
Sep 5, 2020	Vancouver Whitecaps FC	3–2	Toronto FC
Sep 9, 2020	Montreal Impact	1–2	Toronto FC
Sep 13, 2020	Vancouver Whitecaps FC	2–4	Montreal Impact
Sep 16, 2020	Vancouver Whitecaps FC	3–1	Montreal Impact

=== Canadian Premier League ===
The winner of the 2020 Canadian Premier League season, Forge FC, qualified for the Canadian Championship. The season was held from August to September in three stages – a first stage, group stage, and final.

First stage	Group stage
Pos / Team / Pld / Pts; 1 / Cavalry / 7 / 13; 2 / HFX Wanderers / 7 / 12; **3** / Forge / **7** / 12; 4 / Pacific / 7 / 11; 5 / York9 / 7 / 10; 6 / Valour / 7 / 8; 7 / Atlético Ottawa / 7 / 8; 8 / FC Edmonton / 7 / 1; Source: CanPL.ca	Pos / Team / Pld / Pts; **1** / Forge / **3** / **7**; 2 / HFX Wanderers / 3 / **4**; 3 / Cavalry / 3 / **3**; 4 / Pacific / 3 / **3**; Source: CanPL.ca
2020 Canadian Premier League Final
September 19 3:00 pm ADT: Forge FC / 2–0 / HFX Wanderers FC; Alumni Field, Charlottetown, Prince Edward Island

=== Qualified teams ===
Team	League	City	Previous finals appearances (bold indicates winners)
Toronto FC	Major League Soccer	Toronto, Ontario	7 (**2011**, **2012**, 2014, **2016**, **2017**, **2018**, 2019, 2021)
Forge FC	Canadian Premier League	Hamilton, Ontario	None

== Final ==
On March 11, 2021, it was announced that the match could not be completed in time for the start of CCL competition; a compromise was reached where Toronto FC would be named to the CCL slot, while Forge FC would be permitted to host the match once it was finally played. On March 25, 2021, Canada Soccer president Nick Bontis said that the final may end up taking place as late as July 2022. On March 2, 2022, it was announced that the final would take place on June 4, 2022, at Tim Hortons Field.

June 4, 2022
7:00 pm EDT

Forge FC	1–1	Toronto FC
Borges 60'	Report	Pozuelo 57'
Penalties
Achinioti-Jönsson (penalty scored); Campbell (penalty scored); Pacius (penalty scored); Bekker (penalty missed); Choinière (penalty scored); Poku (penalty missed)	4–5	(penalty scored) Jiménez; (penalty scored) Salcedo; (penalty missed) Kerr; (penalty scored) Pozuelo; (penalty scored) Perruzza; (penalty scored) Thompson

Tim Hortons Field, Hamilton, Ontario
Attendance: 13,715
Referee: Silviu Petrescu

Forge FC	Toronto FC

GK	1	(Canada) Triston Henry
RB	24	(Albania) Rezart Rama
CB	13	(Sweden) Alexander Achinioti-Jönsson	(yellow card) 25'
CB	81	(England) Malik Owolabi-Belewu	(yellow card) 55'
LB	3	(Canada) Ashtone Morgan	(yellow card) 77'	(substituted off) 84'
CM	33	(Mali) Aboubacar Sissoko		(substituted off) 75'
CM	21	(Canada) Alessandro Hojabrpour	(yellow card) 81'
CM	10	(Canada) Kyle Bekker (c)
RW	7	(Canada) David Choinière
CF	9	(Canada) Terran Campbell
LW	19	(Canada) Tristan Borges	(yellow card) 67'	(substituted off) 67'
Substitutes:
GK	29	(Canada) Christopher Kalongo
MF	12	(Canada) Sebastian Castello
FW	14	(Guyana) Emery Welshman		(substituted on) 75'
FW	17	(Canada) Woobens Pacius		(substituted on) 67'
MF	20	(Canada) Kwasi Poku		(substituted on) 84'
MF	22	(Canada) Noah Jensen
DF	28	(Canada) Daniel Stampatori
Manager: (Canada) Bobby Smyrniotis

GK	16	(United States) Quentin Westberg
RB	47	(Canada) Kosi Thompson
CB	5	(Canada) Lukas MacNaughton	(yellow card) 24'	(substituted off) 90+2'
CB	3	(Mexico) Carlos Salcedo
LB	38	(Canada) Luca Petrasso	(yellow card) 19'	(substituted off) 65'
CM	29	(Canada) Deandre Kerr
CM	4	(United States) Michael Bradley (c)
CM	11	(Canada) Jayden Nelson		(substituted off) 46'
RW	20	(Canada) Ayo Akinola	(yellow card) 69'	(substituted off) 79'
CF	9	(Spain) Jesús Jiménez
LW	10	(Spain) Alejandro Pozuelo	(yellow card) 62'
Substitutes:
GK	25	(United States) Alex Bono
MF	8	(Canada) Ralph Priso		(substituted on) 90+2'
DF	12	(Canada) Kadin Chung		(substituted on) 65'
FW	22	(Canada) Jacob Shaffelburg		(substituted on) 46'
FW	77	(Canada) Jordan Perruzza		(substituted on) 79'
MF	81	(Canada) Themi Antonoglou
FW	99	(Nigeria) Ifunanyachi Achara
Manager: (United States) Bob Bradley

Assistant referees:
Peter Pendli
Jason Vaillancourt
Fourth official:
David Barrie

== See also ==
- 2020 Canadian Premier League season
