= Jordan Perruzza =

Canadian soccer player (born 2001)

Personal information
- Full name: Jordan Loreto Perruzza
- Date of birth: January 16, 2001 (age 25)
- Place of birth: Toronto, Ontario, Canada
- Height: 6 ft 1 in (1.85 m)
- Position: Forward

Youth career
- Woodbridge Strikers
- Vaughan SC
- 2012–2014: Toronto FC
- 2014–2018: Empoli

Senior career*
Years	Team	Apps	(Gls)
2018–2020	Toronto FC II	28	(17)
2020	→ San Antonio FC (loan)	5	(3)
2021–2024	Toronto FC	23	(1)
2021	→ San Antonio FC (loan)	6	(1)
2021–2023	→ Toronto FC II (loan)	14	(2)
2023	→ HFX Wanderers (loan)	10	(2)
2024	→ Toronto FC II (loan)	2	(1)
2024	Real Monarchs	8	(1)

International career^{‡}
2018	Canada U20	4	(1)
- * Club domestic league appearances and goals as of October 6, 2024 ‡ National team caps and goals as of November 10, 2018

Jordan Loreto Perruzza (born January 16, 2001) is a Canadian soccer player.

== Early life ==
Perruzza began playing youth soccer with Woodbridge Strikers and Vaughan SC. In December 2012, he joined the Toronto FC Academy. In 2014, he moved to Italy joining the youth setup of Empoli, where they got him an Italian passport, through his Italian heritage.

== Club career ==
=== Toronto FC ===
Perruzza joined Toronto FC II in August 2018. He scored his first goal for the club against Louisville City FC on October 8, 2018.

In August 2020, Perruzza signed a first-team deal with Toronto FC, which became effective on January 1, 2021. In September 2020, he was loaned to USL Championship side San Antonio FC. He scored his first goals for San Antonio on September 19, netting a brace in a 2–0 victory over the Oklahoma City Energy.

He made his Toronto FC first team debut on April 14, 2021 against Mexican side León in the CONCACAF Champions League, with his MLS debut occurring three days later against CF Montréal. In May 2021, he returned to San Antonio FC on loan. In his first match on May 22, he scored the winning goal in the 81st minute against Birmingham Legion FC. He was recalled from his loan on July 16, and later loaned to Toronto FC II for some matches in 2021. He scored his first MLS goal on October 30, 2021 against Atlanta United.

In January 2022, Toronto FC announced they had signed Perruzza to a new deal through 2024, with an option for 2025. In August 2023, he was loaned to the HFX Wanderers in the Canadian Premier League for the remainder of the 2023 season. He made his CPL debut on August 7 against Pacific FC. He scored his first CPL goal on September 4 against York United FC. In May 2024, Perruzza was waived by Toronto FC, ending his time with the club.

=== Real Monarchs ===
In August 2024, he signed with the Real Monarchs in MLS Next Pro. He scored his first goal on September 29 against Portland Timbers 2.

== International career ==
Peruzza was born in Canada to an Italian father and a Canadian mother. Peruzza was named to the Canadian U20 team for the 2018 CONCACAF U-20 Championship on October 24, 2018. Perruzza was named to the Canadian U-23 provisional roster for the 2020 CONCACAF Men's Olympic Qualifying Championship on February 26, 2020.

== Career statistics ==
As of match played October 9, 2024

Club	Season	League			Playoffs		National Cup		Continental		Other		Total	
Club	Season	Division	Apps	Goals	Apps	Goals	Apps	Goals	Apps	Goals	Apps	Goals	Apps	Goals
Toronto FC II	2018	USL	4	2	—		–		—		—		4	2
Toronto FC II	2019	USL League One	24	15	—		—		—		—		24	15
Toronto FC II	Total		28	17	0	0	0	0	0	0	0	0	28	17
San Antonio FC (loan)	2020	USL Championship	5	3	1	0	—		—		—		6	3
Toronto FC	2021	Major League Soccer	5	1	—		1	0	1	0	—		7	1
Toronto FC	2022	Major League Soccer	13	0	—		4 (Note: Includes appearance in 2020 Canadian Championship final (played in 2022))	1	—		—		17	1
Toronto FC	2023	Major League Soccer	5	0	—		0	0	—		1 (Note: Appearance in Leagues Cup)	0	6	0
Toronto FC	Total		23	1	0	0	5	1	1	0	1	0	30	2
San Antonio FC (loan)	2021	USL Championship	6	1	0	0	—		—		—		6	1
Toronto FC II (loan)	2021	USL League One	2	0	—		—		—		—		2	0
Toronto FC II (loan)	2022	MLS Next Pro	11	2	2	0	—		—		—		13	2
Toronto FC II (loan)	2023	MLS Next Pro	1	0	—		—		—		—		1	0
Toronto FC II (loan)	Total		14	2	2	0	0	0	0	0	0	0	16	2
HFX Wanderers FC (loan)	2023	Canadian Premier League	10	2	1	0	0	0	—		—		11	2
Toronto FC II (loan)	2024	MLS Next Pro	2	1	—		—		—		—		2	1
Real Monarchs	2024	MLS Next Pro	8	1	—		—		—		—		8	1
Career total			96	28	4	0	5	1	1	0	1	0	107	29

== Honours ==
Toronto FC

- Canadian Championship: 2020
