= Reshaun Walkes =

Canadian soccer player (born 1999)

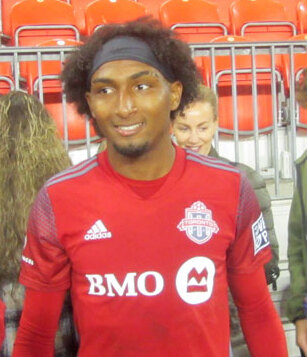
- Walkes in 2023

Personal information
- Date of birth: November 7, 1999 (age 27)
- Place of birth: Brampton, Ontario, Canada
- Height: 5 ft 11 in (1.80 m)
- Position: Forward

Team information
- Current team: Scrosoppi FC

Youth career
- Ajax SC
- Toronto Eagles SC
- Dixie SC
- 2014–2016: Richmond Hill SC
- 2017: Erin Mills SC

College career
Years	Team	Apps	(Gls)
2017	Sheridan Bruins	9	(5)
2018–2019	Lewis and Clark Trailblazers	30	(27)
2020–2021	UTRGV Vaqueros	25	(14)

Senior career*
Years	Team	Apps	(Gls)
2018–2019	Master's FA	17	(6)
2021	Des Moines Menace	11	(1)
2022–2023	Toronto FC II	40	(12)
2024	Vaughan Azzurri	20	(18)
2025	Simcoe County Rovers	20	(9)
2025	HFX Wanderers FC	2	(0)
2026–	Scrosoppi FC	1	(0)
- * Club domestic league appearances and goals as of April 18, 2026

Reshaun Walkes (born November 7, 1999) is a Canadian professional soccer player who plays as a forward for Scrosoppi FC in League1 Ontario.

== Early life ==
He played youth soccer with Ajax SC, Toronto Eagles SC, Dixie SC, Richmond Hill SC, and Erin Mills SC. During his youth, he attended tryouts with the Toronto FC Academy, but ultimately did not make the team.

== College career ==
He began his post-secondary career in 2017 at Sheridan College, where he scored five goals in nine games. He played one season at Sheridan, highlighted by a goal in the first 40 seconds of a playoff match against Cambrian College.

After a year in Canada, he decided to attend school in the United States, moving to Lewis and Clark Community College in 2018, with whom he played for two seasons, scoring ten goals and adding eight assists in 2018, followed by 17 goals with 11 assists in 2019. During his time at Lewis and Clark, he was named a Third Team NCJAA All-American, a two-time All-Region First Team Honoree, a two-time United Soccer Coaches First Team honoree and Region 24 Player of the Year.

After two years with Lewis and Clark, he transferred to the University of Texas Rio Grande Valley in 2020, where he played for the men's soccer team, earning All-WAC Second Team honours in his first year, after finishing second on the team in goals, points, shots, and shots on goal. He scored a hat trick in the 2021 season opener on August 26 the Central Arkansas Bears, earning school Student-Athlete of the Week honours. In his second season, he led the Vaqueros in goals, assists, points, shots, shots on goal, and game winning goals. After the season, he was named to the All-WAC Second Team for the second consecutive year.

== Club career ==
In 2018 and 2019, he played with Master's FA in League1 Ontario, scoring six goals in 17 appearances. He scored his first goal on July 7, 2018 against ProStars FC. Later that season, on July 28, he scored a brace in a 2-2 draw with Ottawa South United. The following season, he scored a hat trick against FC London on June 9, 2019 in a 4-3 victory.

In 2021, he played with the Des Moines Menace in USL League Two, scoring once in the regular season against FC Wichita on June 24. In the playoffs, he earned Goal of the Week honours after self-assisting himself on a header goal against Kalamazoo FC. He won the USL League Two that season with the Menace.

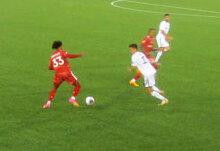
Reshaun Walkes with Toronto FC II in 2023

In 2022, he was drafted by his hometown Toronto FC at the 2022 MLS SuperDraft. After attending pre-season with Toronto FC, he ultimately signed a contract with the second team Toronto FC II for the 2022 season in MLS Next Pro. He scored his first professional goal in a 4-2 victory over FC Cincinnati 2 on April 30. On August 7, he scored a brace against Orlando City B.

In 2024, he went on trial with Canadian Premier League club York United FC during their pre-season. Afterwards, he joined Vaughan Azzurri in League1 Ontario. He helped Vaughan capture the league cup, scoring the winning penalty kick in their shootout victory over Simcoe County Rovers FC in the final. He won the league Golden Boot and was named a First Team All-Star.

In March 2025, he joined Simcoe County Rovers FC. At the end of the season, he was named a league Second Team All-Star.

In September 2025, he signed with Canadian Premier League club HFX Wanderers FC for the remainder of the 2025 season, with options for 2026 and 2027. He made his debut on September 6, in a substitute appearance, against Forge FC.

== Career statistics ==
As of October 27, 2025

Club	Season	League			Playoffs		National cup		League cup		Total	
Club	Season	Division	Apps	Goals	Apps	Goals	Apps	Goals	Apps	Goals	Apps	Goals
Master's FA	2018	League1 Ontario	9	3	–		–				9	3
Master's FA	2019	League1 Ontario	8	3	0	0	–		–		8	3
Master's FA	Total		17	6	0	0	0	0	0	0	17	6
Des Moines Menace	2021	USL League Two	11	1	3+	1	–		–		14	2
Toronto FC II	2022	MLS Next Pro	17	6	2	0	–		–		19	6
Toronto FC II	2023	MLS Next Pro	22	6	–		–		–		22	6
Toronto FC II	Total		40	12	2	0	0	0	0	0	42	12
Vaughan Azzurri	2024	League1 Ontario Premier	20	18	–		–		4	3	24	21
Simcoe County Rovers FC	2025	League1 Ontario Premier	20	9	–		–		3	2	23	11
HFX Wanderers FC	2025	Canadian Premier League	2	0	0	0	0	0	–		2	0
Career total			110	46	5	1	0	0	7	5	122	52
