= Jordan Faria =

Canadian professional soccer player

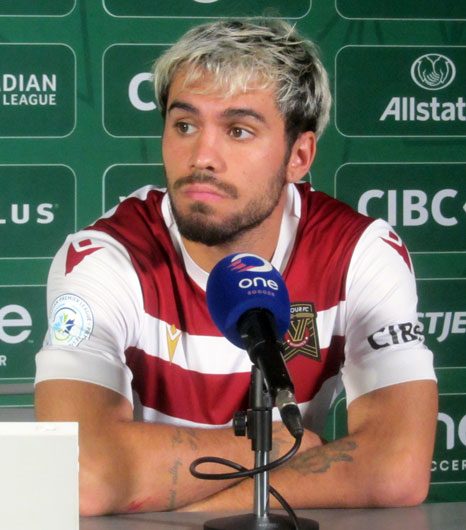
- Faria in 2024

Personal information
- Full name: Jordan Mackenzie Faria
- Date of birth: June 13, 2000 (age 26)
- Place of birth: Brampton, Ontario, Canada
- Height: 1.73 m (5 ft 8 in)
- Position: Midfielder

Youth career
- 2005–2011: Brampton YSC
- 2012–2018: Toronto FC

Senior career*
Years	Team	Apps	(Gls)
2016–2018	Toronto FC III	32	(7)
2018–2020	Toronto FC II	32	(2)
2021	York United	12	(1)
2022	MuSa	20	(6)
2023	Toronto FC II	23	(4)
2023	→ Toronto FC (loan)	1	(0)
2024–2025	Valour FC	51	(4)
2026	Waterford	10	(0)

International career^{‡}
2015	Canada U15		
2017	Canada U17	3	(0)
- * Club domestic league appearances and goals as of October 30, 2026 ‡ National team caps and goals as of April 28, 2017

Jordan Mackenzie Faria (born June 13, 2000) is a Canadian professional footballer who plays as a midfielder.

== Early life ==
Faria began playing youth soccer at age five with Brampton Youth SC. In January 2012, he joined the Toronto FC Academy.

== Club career ==
From 2016 to 2018, Faria played with Toronto FC III in League1 Ontario.

In 2018, he began playing with Toronto FC II in the USL on an academy contract. On April 7, 2018, he made his debut against Pittsburgh Riverhounds SC. He scored his first professional goal on May 19, 2018 against the Charlotte Independence. In July 2018, he officially signed his first professional contract with Toronto FC II. On September 6, 2019, he scored a free kick goal which earned USL League One Fans’ Choice Goal of the Week honours.

In June 2021, Faria joined Canadian Premier League side York United. He scored his first goal for the club on October 17, 2021 in a 1-1 draw against FC Edmonton. In December 2021, York announced they had declined Faria's contract option for the 2022 season.

In April 2022, he signed with Finnish club MuSa in the Kakkonen, after going on trial with the club in March. On July 9, 2022, he scored a brace against SalPa in a 4-1 victory.

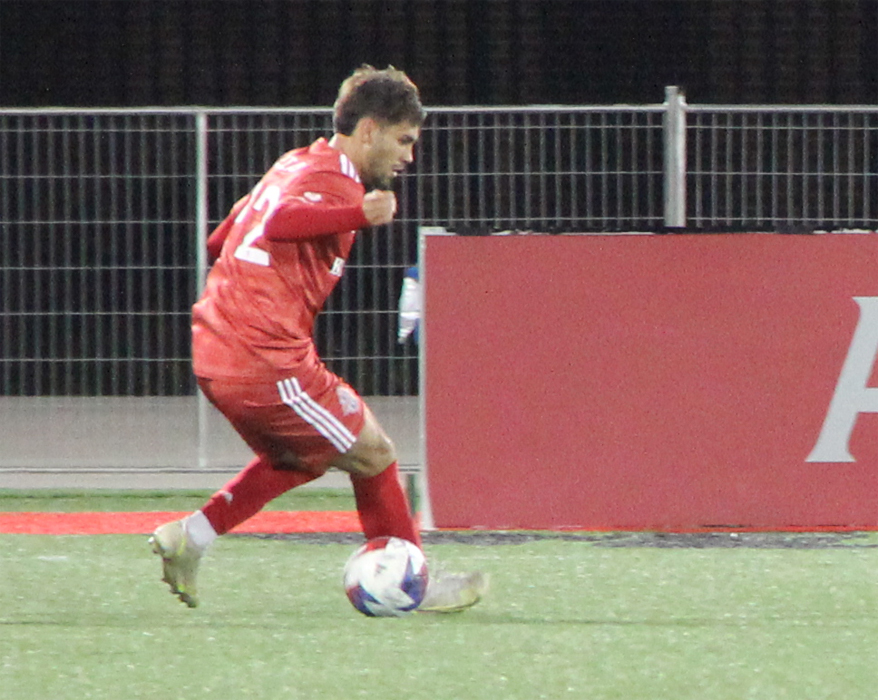
Faria with Toronto FC II in 2023

In March 2023, he returned to Toronto FC II, now in MLS Next Pro. On May 7, 2023, he scored a brace in a 3-0 victory over FC Cincinnati 2, to lead the team to their first victory of the season. On May 20, 2023, he signed a short-term loan with the Toronto FC first team, ahead of their match against Austin FC, making his debut in the match, coming on as a substitute for Italian designated player Federico Bernardeschi in the 67th minute.

In December 2023, Faria returned to the Canadian Premier League, signing with Valour FC for the 2024 season. After the 2024 season, the club picked up his option for the 2025 season.

In January 2026, Faria signed for League of Ireland Premier Division club Waterford. In November 2026, it was announced that Faria had been released following the end of his contract with the club, after scoring 1 goal in 13 appearances during his season there.

== International career ==
In October 2014, Faria made his debut in the Canada national team program, attending a U15 identification camp. In August 2015, he was named to the U15 squad for the U15 Torneo Internacional. He was later named to the Canada U17 for the 2017 CONCACAF U-17 Championship. In 2017, Jordan Faria was a runner-up for the Canadian U17 Player of the Year award.

== Career statistics ==
As of October 30, 2026

Club	Season	League			Domestic Cup (Note: Includes Canadian Championship, Finnish Cup & FAI Cup)		League Cup (Note: Includes L1 Cup)		Other (Note: Includes Leagues Cup)		Total	
Club	Season	Division	Apps	Goals	Apps	Goals	Apps	Goals	Apps	Goals	Apps	Goals
Toronto FC III	2016	League1 Ontario	7	1	—		2	0	—		9	1
Toronto FC III	2017	League1 Ontario	20	3	—		2	0	—		22	3
Toronto FC III	2018	League1 Ontario	5	3	—		1	0	—		6	3
Toronto FC III	Total		32	7	—		5	0	—		37	7
Toronto FC II	2018	USL	14	1	—		—		—		14	1
Toronto FC II	2019	USL League One	18	1	—		—		—		18	1
Toronto FC II	Total		32	2	—		—		—		32	2
York United FC	2021	Canadian Premier League	12	1	1	0	—		0 (Note: Appearances in the 2021 Canadian Premier League Playoffs)	0	13	1
Musan Salama	2022	Kakkonen	20	6	1	0	—		—		21	6
Toronto FC II	2023	MLS Next Pro	23	4	—		—		—		23	4
Toronto FC (loan)	2023	Major League Soccer	1	0	0	0	—		0	0	1	0
Valour FC	2024	Canadian Premier League	26	2	1	0	—		—		27	2
Valour FC	2025	Canadian Premier League	25	2	3	0	—		—		28	2
Valour FC	Total		51	4	4	0	—		—		55	4
Waterford	2026	LOI Premier Division	10	0	1	0	—		2 (Note: Appearances in the Munster Senior Cup)	1	13	1
Career total			181	24	7	0	5	0	2	1	195	25
