= Antony Ćurić =

Canadian soccer player

Personal information
- Full name: Antony Stjepan Ćurić
- Date of birth: January 16, 2001 (age 25)
- Place of birth: Toronto, Ontario, Canada
- Height: 6 ft 3 in (1.91 m)
- Position: Defender

Team information
- Current team: Arendal
- Number: 15

Youth career
- 2016–2019: Erin Mills SC
- 2020: Toronto FC

College career
Years	Team	Apps	(Gls)
2019	Ryerson Rams	13	(0)

Senior career*
Years	Team	Apps	(Gls)
2021–2024	Toronto FC II	55	(2)
2023–2024	→ Toronto FC (loan)	1	(0)
2024–2025	ND Gorica	28	(0)
2025–	Arendal	29	(1)
- * Club domestic league appearances and goals as of November 15, 2026

Antony Stjepan Ćurić (born January 16, 2001) is a Canadian soccer player who plays for Arendal in the Norwegian Second Division.

== Early career ==
Curic spent four years playing youth soccer with the Erin Mills Eagles where he won two Ontario Cup championships, the first in 2016 in which he scored twice in a 5–0 win in the finals. In May 2019, while with Erin Mills, he was invited to an international identification camp hosted by ANB Futbol, where he impressed scouts and was invited to a one-week camp hosted by French Ligue 2 club FC Lorient to train with their academy. He later spent some time with the Toronto FC Academy.

In 2019, he began attending Ryerson University joining the Rams soccer team, playing one year with the team.

== Club career ==
In December 2020, he signed his first professional contract, for two seasons, with Toronto FC II of USL League One to join the team for the 2021 season. He made his debut for Toronto FC II on May 22, 2021, against North Texas SC. On April 23, 2023, he scored his first goal against Philadelphia Union II. On May 13, 2023, he joined the Toronto FC first team on a short-term loan ahead of their match against CF Montréal. He made his MLS debut that day coming on as a late game substitute. He signed additional short-term loans on May 17 and May 20. In March 2024, he re-signed with TFC2 for the 2024 season. In May 2024, he joined the first team on another short-term loan. In June 2024, he agreed to a mutual termination of his contract with the club.

In July 2024, he signed with Slovenian Second League club ND Gorica.

On 5 August 2025, he signed a contract for the rest of the year with Norwegian Second Division side Arendal Fotball.

== Career statistics ==
As of match played November 15, 2026

Appearances and goals by club, season and competition
Club	Season	League			Playoffs		National cup		Other		Total	
Club	Season	Division	Apps	Goals	Apps	Goals	Apps	Goals	Apps	Goals	Apps	Goals
Toronto FC II	2021	USL League One	15	0	—		—		—		15	0
Toronto FC II	2022	MLS Next Pro	15	0	2	0	—		—		17	0
Toronto FC II	2023	MLS Next Pro	19	2	—		—		—		19	2
Toronto FC II	2024	MLS Next Pro	6	0	—		—		—		6	0
Toronto FC II	Total		55	2	2	0	0	0	0	0	57	2
Toronto FC (loan)	2023	Major League Soccer	1	0	—		0	0	—		1	0
Toronto FC (loan)	2024	Major League Soccer	0	0	—		1	0	—		1	0
Toronto FC (loan)	Total		1	0	0	0	1	0	0	0	2	0
ND Gorica	2024–25	Slovenian Second League	28	0	—		1	0	—		29	0
Arendal	2025	Norwegian Second Division	11	1	—		2	1	0	0	11	1
Arendal	2026	Norwegian Second Division	18	0	—		1	0	0	0	18	0
Arendal	Total		29	1	0	0	3	1	0	0	32	2
Career total			113	3	2	0	5	1	0	0	120	4
