= Lazar Stefanovic (soccer) =

Canadian soccer player (born 2006)

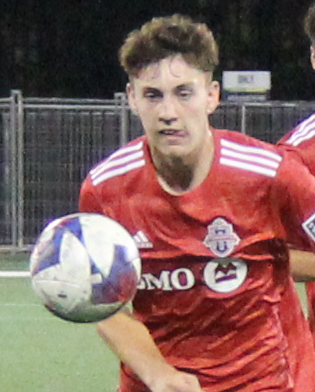
- Stefanovic playing for Toronto FC II in 2023

Personal information
- Date of birth: August 10, 2006 (age 20)
- Place of birth: Clearwater, Florida, United States
- Height: 1.87 m (6 ft 1 1/2 in)
- Position: Centre-back

Team information
- Current team: Toronto FC
- Number: 76

Youth career
- Oakville SC
- 2016–: Toronto FC

Senior career*
Years	Team	Apps	(Gls)
2021	Toronto FC IV	6	(1)
2022–2024	Toronto FC II	31	(0)
2023	→ Toronto FC (loan)	2	(0)
2025–	Toronto FC	20	(0)
2025–	→ Toronto FC II (loan)	7	(0)

International career^{‡}
2022	Canada U17	13	(1)
2024	Canada U20	3	(0)
- * Club domestic league appearances and goals as of September 20, 2026 ‡ National team caps and goals as of February 27, 2024

Lazar Stefanovic (born August 10, 2006) is a professional soccer player who plays as a centre-back for Toronto FC in Major League Soccer. Born in the United States, he represented Canada at youth level.

== Early life ==
Born in Clearwater, Florida, Stefanovic moved to Canada at a young age and was raised in Oakville, Ontario. He began playing soccer at age three with Oakville SC. In 2016, he joined the Toronto FC Academy. In June 2023, he was named to the MLS Next All-Star Game.

== Club career ==
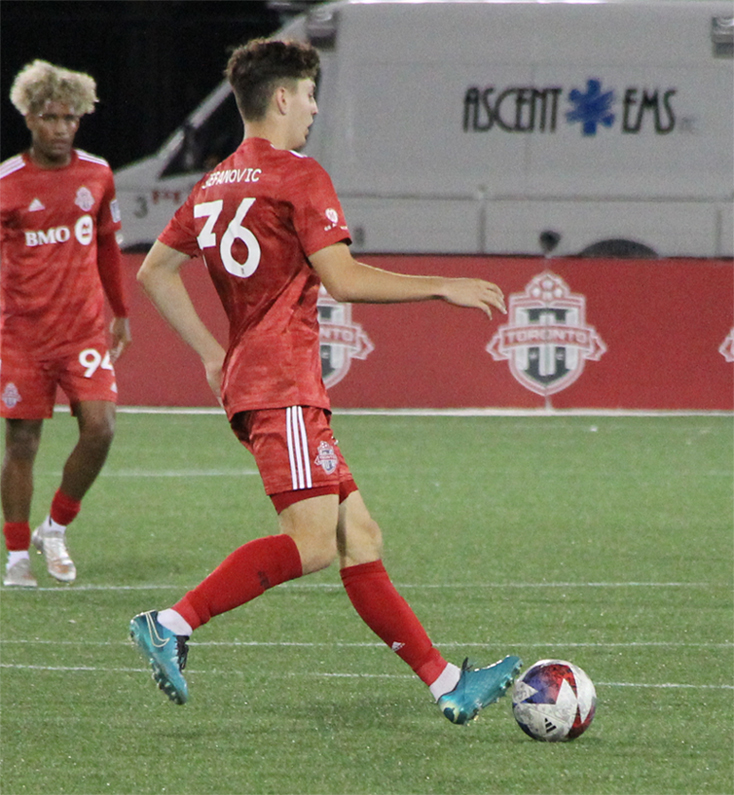
Stefanovic with Toronto FC II in 2023

In 2021, Stefanovic played with Toronto FC IV in the League1 Ontario Summer Championship.

On April 30, 2022, Stefanovic made his professional debut with Toronto FC II in MLS Next Pro against FC Cincinnati 2, as an academy call-up. On June 30, 2023, he signed an official professional contract with Toronto FC II, after having already played 13 games that season as an academy call-up. The next day, he joined the Toronto FC first team on a short-term loan, making his Major League Soccer debut that day in a substitute appearance in a 1–0 loss to Real Salt Lake. He became the second-youngest player to appear in an MLS match for Toronto FC (16 years, 10 months and 22 days). He signed another short-term loan ahead of a Leagues Cup match against Mexican club Atlas. He joined the first team for their 2024 preseason training camp. He missed much of the 2024 season due to injury from a broken bone, suffered while on international duty.

After initially signing as an off-roster player earlier, he would officially join the Toronto FC first team roster for the 2025 season. In 2025, he was loaned to the second team for some matches.

== International career ==
Stefanovic is of Serbian descent, born in the United States, and raised in Canada, and eligible for all three nations at international level.

In August 2022, Stefanovic was called up to a training camp for the United States U17 team.

In October 2022, he made his debut in the Canadian program, attending a camp with the Canada U17 team. He represented Canada at the 2023 CONCACAF U-17 Championship, where he scored his first goal on 22 February 2023, against Puerto Rico U17. In February 2024, he was named to the Canada U20 for the 2024 CONCACAF Under-20 Championship qualifiers.

On June 18, 2025, Stefanovic was called up as a training player with Canada senior team during the group stage of the 2025 CONCACAF Gold Cup.

== Career statistics ==
As of match played September 20, 2026

Appearances and goals by club, season and competition
Club	Season	League			Playoffs		National cup		Continental		Other		Total	
Club	Season	Division	Apps	Goals	Apps	Goals	Apps	Goals	Apps	Goals	Apps	Goals	Apps	Goals
Toronto FC IV	2021	League1 Ontario Summer Championship	6	1	–		–		–		—		6	1
Toronto FC II	2022	MLS Next Pro	1	0	0	0	–		–		—		1	0
Toronto FC II	2023	MLS Next Pro	25	0	–		–		–		—		25	0
Toronto FC II	2024	MLS Next Pro	5	0	—		–		–		—		5	0
Toronto FC II	Total		31	0	0	0	0	0	0	0	0	0	31	0
Toronto FC (loan)	2023	Major League Soccer	2	0	–		0	0	–		1 (Note: Appearance in Leagues Cup)	0	3	0
Toronto FC	2025	Major League Soccer	14	0	–		1	0	–		–		15	0
Toronto FC	2026	Major League Soccer	6	0	0	0	0	0	0	0	0	0	6	0
Toronto FC	Total		20	0	0	0	0	1	0	0	0	0	21	0
Toronto FC II (loan)	2025	MLS Next Pro	3	0	–		–		–		–		3	0
Toronto FC II (loan)	2026	MLS Next Pro	4	0	–		–		–		–		4	0
Toronto FC II (loan)	Total		7	0	0	0	0	0	0	0	0	0	7	0
Career total			66	1	0	0	1	0	0	0	1	0	68	1
