= Antonio Carlini =

Canadian soccer player

Personal information
- Full name: Antonio Frederick Michael Carlini
- Date of birth: February 23, 2001 (age 25)
- Place of birth: Ottawa, Ontario, Canada
- Height: 5 ft 10 in (1.78 m)
- Position: Midfielder

Youth career
- Nepean Hotspurs SC
- 2013–2016: Ottawa South United
- 2017–2021: Toronto FC

Senior career*
Years	Team	Apps	(Gls)
2019–2022	Toronto FC II	38	(4)
- * Club domestic league appearances and goals as of November 15, 2022

Antonio Frederick Michael Carlini (born February 23, 2001) is a Canadian soccer player who plays as a midfielder.

== Early life ==
Carlini was born in Ottawa, Ontario, and is of Italian descent. Carlini began his youth career with Nepean Hotspurs SC at age six, later moving to Ottawa South United from U12 until U15. In March 2016, he had a week-long trial with English club Crewe Alexandra. He joined the Toronto FC Academy in 2017, where he was eventually named captain of the academy team.

== Club career ==
While with the TFC Academy, he made his debut for Toronto FC II in USL League One in 2019 against South Georgia Tormenta FC. He officially signed a professional contract with Toronto FC II in July 2020. He scored his first goal on July 1, 2021 against South Georgia Tormenta FC in a 2-1 victory. He won USL League One Goal of the Week and Goal of the Month honours for his goal on August 6, 2019 against the Richmond Kickers, also earning Team of the Week honours that week. In 2021, he led the team in game winning goals with three.

== International career ==
In 2016, he was called up to the Canadian U15 national team camp.

== Career statistics ==
As of October 2, 2022

Club	Season	League			Playoffs		Domestic Cup		Continental		Total	
Club	Season	Division	Apps	Goals	Apps	Goals	Apps	Goals	Apps	Goals	Apps	Goals
Toronto FC II	2019	USL League One	3	0	–		–		–		3	0
Toronto FC II	2021	USL League One	27	3	–		–		–		27	3
Toronto FC II	2022	MLS Next Pro	8	1	2	0	–		–		10	1
Career total			38	4	2	0	0	0	0	0	40	4
