= Nakye Greenidge-Duncan =

Canadian soccer player

Personal information
- Full name: Nakye Greenidge-Duncan
- Date of birth: April 22, 2003 (age 23)
- Place of birth: Toronto, Ontario, Canada
- Height: 5 ft 8 in (1.73 m)
- Position: Midfielder

Team information
- Current team: Vaughan Azzurri

Youth career
- 2015–2021: Toronto FC

Senior career*
Years	Team	Apps	(Gls)
2021–2022	Toronto FC II	15	(3)
2023	New England Revolution II	9	(0)
2025	Simcoe County Rovers	15	(0)
2026–	Vaughan Azzurri	1	(0)
- * Club domestic league appearances and goals as of April 20, 2026

Nakye Greenidge-Duncan (born April 22, 2003) is a Canadian soccer player who plays for Vaughan Azzurri in the Ontario Premier League.

== Early life ==
In 2014, Greenidge-Duncan trialed with Dutch club Feyenoord's academy, after catching the club's attention during a camp run by the club in Toronto. He joined the Toronto FC Academy in 2015. In 2015, he helped the TFC U12 team win the inaugural Generation Adidas Cup, winning MVP honours. The championship qualified the team for the Arousa Futbol 7 tournament, where they faced top European Academy teams, including Barcelona, against whom Greenidge-Duncan scored in a 2–2 draw.

== Club career ==
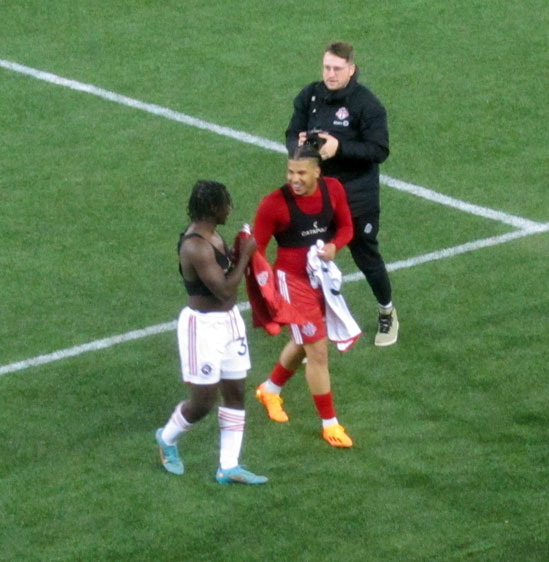
Nakye Greenidge-Duncan exchanges jerseys with Rohan Goulbourne in 2023

On April 1, 2021, he signed his first professional contract with Toronto FC II of USL League One (they moved to MLS Next Pro in 2022). He made his debut on October 1 against North Carolina FC. He scored his first goal on April 17, 2022, against Chicago Fire FC II. On June 11, 2022, he scored a game-winning goal in stoppage time to give his team a 1–0 victory over Philadelphia Union II. He scored three goals and added one assist, during the 2022 season. After the 2022 season, Toronto declined his player option for 2023.

In January 2023, he signed with New England Revolution II in MLS Next Pro. After the season, the club declined his option for the 2024 season.

In 2025, he joined the Simcoe County Rovers in League1 Ontario.

== Career statistics ==
As of July 12, 2023

Club	Season	League			Playoffs		Domestic Cup		League Cup		Total	
Club	Season	Division	Apps	Goals	Apps	Goals	Apps	Goals	Apps	Goals	Apps	Goals
Toronto FC II	2021	USL League One	1	0	—		–		–		1	0
Toronto FC II	2022	MLS Next Pro	14	3	0	0	–		–		14	3
Toronto FC II	Total		15	3	0	0	0	0	0	0	15	3
New England Revolution II	2023	MLS Next Pro	9	0	0	0	–		–		9	0
Simcoe County Rovers FC	2025	League1 Ontario Premier	15	0	–		–		2	0	17	0
Career total			39	3	0	0	0	0	2	0	41	3
