= Jalen Watson =

Canadian soccer player (born 2000)

Personal information
- Full name: Jalen Antonio Ellis-Watson
- Date of birth: March 23, 2000 (age 26)
- Place of birth: Mississauga, Ontario, Canada
- Height: 6 ft 0 in (1.83 m)
- Position: Defender

Team information
- Current team: Oakville SC

Youth career
- Brampton East SC
- Erin Mills SC
- 2017–2019: Vancouver Whitecaps FC

College career
Years	Team	Apps	(Gls)
2019–2022	Penn State Nittany Lions	59	(1)

Senior career*
Years	Team	Apps	(Gls)
2023	Toronto FC II	2	(0)
2023	→ Pacific FC (loan)	0	(0)
2024	Simcoe County Rovers	13	(1)
2024	→ Simcoe County Rovers B	2	(0)
2025–	Oakville SC	17	(2)
- * Club domestic league appearances and goals as of August 24, 2025

Jalen Antonio Ellis-Watson (born March 23, 2000) is a Canadian professional soccer player who plays for Oakville SC in League1 Ontario.

== Early life ==
Watson played youth soccer with Erin Mills SC. In August 2017, Watson joined the Vancouver Whitecaps Academy, where he played for two years.

== College career ==
In 2019, Watson began attending Pennsylvania State University, where he played for the men's soccer team. On August 30, 2019, he made his collegiate debut against the Stanford Cardinal. On October 15, 2019, he scored his first collegiate goal against the Pittsburgh Panthers. After his freshman season, he was named to the Big Ten Conference All-Freshman Team. In his sophomore and junior seasons, he earned Academic All-Big Ten honours. In his senior season, he was named to the Big Ten All-Tournament team. Over his four years at Penn State, Watson scored one goal and added three assists in 59 appearances.

== Club career ==
At the 2023 MLS SuperDraft, Watson was selected in the second round (32nd overall) by Toronto FC. After attending pre-season with the club, Waston signed a professional contract with the second team, Toronto FC II, in MLS Next Pro. He made his debut on April 14 against New York City FC II. In August 2023, he was loaned to Pacific FC in the Canadian Premier League.

In 2024, he signed with the Simcoe County Rovers in League1 Ontario.

In 2025, he played with Oakville SC in League1 Ontario.

== Career statistics ==
As of August 25, 2025

Club	Season	League			Playoffs		Domestic Cup		League Cup		Total	
Club	Season	Division	Apps	Goals	Apps	Goals	Apps	Goals	Apps	Goals	Apps	Goals
Toronto FC II	2023	MLS Next Pro	2	0	–		–		–		2	0
Pacific FC (loan)	2023	Canadian Premier League	0	0	0	0	0	0	–		0	0
Simcoe County Rovers	2024	League1 Ontario Premier	13	1	–		0	0	2	0	15	1
Simcoe County Rovers B	2024	League2 Ontario	2	0	–		–		–		2	0
Oakville SC	2025	League1 Ontario Premier	17	2	–		–		2	0	19	2
Career total			34	3	0	0	0	0	4	0	38	3
