= Kosi Thompson =

Canadian soccer player (born 2003)

Personal information
- Full name: Kosi Trevor David Thompson
- Date of birth: January 27, 2003 (age 23)
- Place of birth: Toronto, Ontario, Canada
- Height: 5 ft 10 in (1.78 m)
- Positions: Midfielder; right back

Team information
- Current team: Colorado Rapids
- Number: 33

Youth career
- Vaughan Azzurri
- 2015–2021: Toronto FC

Senior career*
Years	Team	Apps	(Gls)
2021	Toronto FC II	27	(1)
2022–2026	Toronto FC	97	(2)
2023	→ Toronto FC II (loan)	1	(0)
2023	→ Lillestrøm (loan)	4	(0)
2026–	Colorado Rapids	19	(2)
- * Club domestic league appearances and goals as of November 7, 2026

Kosi Trevor David Thompson (born January 27, 2003) is a Canadian soccer player who plays for Colorado Rapids in Major League Soccer.

== Early life ==
He began playing soccer in the Vaughan Azzurri youth system. In February 2015, at age 12, he joined the Toronto FC Academy. Terry Dunfield, who became his coach at U14 level, immediately was impressed with his performance both on and off the field, selecting him to be team captain.

As part of the TFC Academy, he helped them to the 2019 U16 Dallas Cup and was named to the 2019-20 Generation Adidas Best XI.

Rather than attend a school with an agreement with the Toronto FC Academy, Thompson chose to remain at his current school, attending Ursula Franklin Academy.

In 2020, he signed a national letter of intent to attend Oregon State University and play for the Beavers men's soccer team for the 2021 season. However, he ultimately did not join Oregon State, turning professional instead.

== Club career ==
On May 13, 2021, he signed his first professional contract with Toronto FC II of USL League One to join the team for the 2021 season. He made his debut for Toronto FC II on May 22, 2021 against North Texas SC. He scored his first professional goal on June 2 against Union Omaha.

After impressing during 2022 preseason, he signed a contract with the first team Toronto FC. He made his first appearance for TFC as a late-game substitution against the Columbus Crew, on March 12, 2022. He started his first match on April 2 against New York City FC. He scored his first goal on April 9 against Real Salt Lake.

In 2023, he was loaned to the second team for some matches. In 2023, he began to be deployed as a right back, after having been a midfielder and attacker throughout his career, and in 2024 spent some time as a centre-back. In August 2023, Thompson was loaned to Lillestrøm of the Eliteserien for the rest of the season, with an option of a permanent transfer. He made his debut on September 3 against Aalesund. The club declined the purchase option after the season.

In March 2026, he was trade to the Colorado Rapids in exchange for up to $200,000 in General Allocation Money and $200,000 in conditional GAM.

== International career ==
In May 2022, Thompson was named to the 60-man provisional Canadian U-20 team for the 2022 CONCACAF U-20 Championship.

== Career statistics ==
As of match played November 7, 2026

Appearances and goals by club, season and competition
Club	Season	League			Playoffs		National cup		Continental		Other		Total	
Club	Season	Division	Apps	Goals	Apps	Goals	Apps	Goals	Apps	Goals	Apps	Goals	Apps	Goals
Toronto FC II	2021	USL League One	27	1	—		—		–		—		27	1
Toronto FC	2022	Major League Soccer	24	1	—		4 (Note: Includes appearance in 2020 Canadian Championship final (played in 2022))	0	—		—		28	1
Toronto FC	2023	Major League Soccer	14	1	—		1	0	—		1 (Note: Appearance(s) in Leagues Cup)	0	16	1
Toronto FC	2024	Major League Soccer	29	0	—		6	0	—		3	0	38	0
Toronto FC	2025	Major League Soccer	28	0	—		1	0	—		—		29	0
Toronto FC	2026	Major League Soccer	2	0	—		—		—		—		2	0
Toronto FC	Total		97	2	0	0	12	0	0	0	4	0	113	2
Toronto FC II (loan)	2023	MLS Next Pro	1	0	—		—		—		—		1	0
Lillestrøm SK (loan)	2023	Eliteserien	4	0	—		0	0	—		—		4	0
Colorado Rapids	2026	Major League Soccer	19	2	—		1	0	—		—		20	2
Career total			148	5	0	0	13	0	0	0	4	0	165	5

== Honours ==
Toronto FC

- Canadian Championship: 2020
