= Kota Sakurai =

Japanese footballer

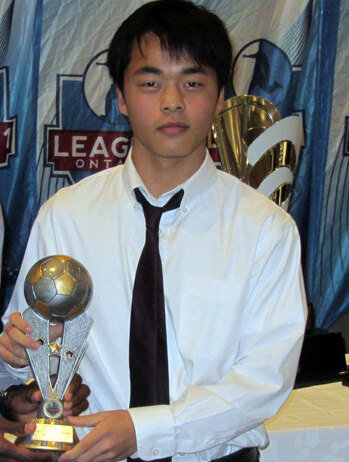
- Sakurai receives L1O Young Player of the Year award in 2016

Personal information
- Date of birth: 26 May 1999 (age 27)
- Place of birth: Yokohama, Japan
- Height: 1.74 m (5 ft 9 in)
- Position: Midfielder

Team information
- Current team: Landskrona BoIS
- Number: 13

Youth career
- Yokohama F. Marinos
- 2015–2017: Toronto FC

College career
Years	Team	Apps	(Gls)
2017–2019	Dartmouth Big Green	47	(2)

Senior career*
Years	Team	Apps	(Gls)
2016–2018	Toronto FC III	40	(3)
2016	Toronto FC II	2	(0)
2021–2022	Ituano FC Yokohama		
2022	Toronto FC II	7	(0)
2023	Ogre United		
2024	FK TransINVEST	20	(0)
2025	FK Sūduva	31	(2)
2026-	Landskrona BoIS	20	(0)
- * Club domestic league appearances and goals as of 11 November 2026

Kota Sakurai (Japanese: 櫻井 功大; born May 26, 1999) is a Japanese professional footballer who plays as a midfielder for Swedish Superettan club Landskrona BoIS.

== Early life ==
Sakurai played youth soccer in Japan with Yokohama F. Marinos. He joined the Toronto FC Academy in October 2015.

== College career ==
After receiving scholarship offers from 14 American universities, Sakurai enrolled at Dartmouth College in 2017. In his freshman year, he won the Ivy League Title with the team. He scored his first goal on October 13, 2018, against the Penn Quakers. In 2020, the season was postponed due to the COVID-19 pandemic, so Sakurai trained with a team in his native Japan four times per week. During his time with the Big Green from 2017 to 2019, he scored two goals and added six assists in 47 appearances.

== Club career ==
Sakurai regularly featured for Toronto FC III during their League1 Ontario and Premier Development League campaigns from 2016 to 2018. He scored his first goal on May 15, 2016, against Windsor TFC. He was named the League1 Ontario Young Player of the Year in 2016, as well as a league Second Team All-Star.

With a number of Toronto FC II players unavailable for upcoming fixtures, Sakurai was called up to the squad in June 2016. He made his professional debut on July 2, 2016, appearing for 14 minutes in a 3–0 defeat to Wilmington Hammerheads in the USL. In doing so, he became the first ever Japanese player to feature competitively for Toronto FC II.

In April 2021, he joined Ituano FC Yokohama, remaining until April 2022.

In April 2022, he signed a professional contract with Toronto FC II in MLS Next Pro, returning to his former club.

In 2023, he joined Latvian Second League club Ogre United.

In February 2024, he joined Lithuanian club FK TransINVEST in the first tier A Lyga.

In January 2025, he signed with FK Sūduva.

In March 2026, he signed a one-year contract with Swedish side Landskrona BoIS.
