= Federico Bernardeschi =

Italian footballer (born 1994)

Federico Bernardeschi Cavaliere OMRI
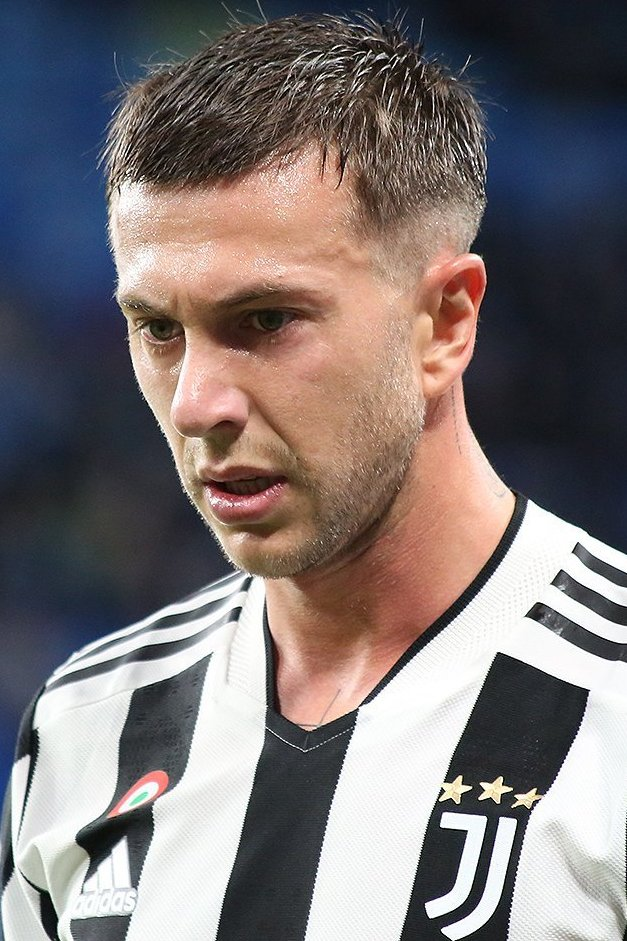
- Bernardeschi with Juventus in 2021

Personal information
- Full name: Federico Bernardeschi
- Date of birth: 16 February 1994 (age 32)
- Place of birth: Carrara, Italy
- Height: 1.84 m (6 ft 0 in)
- Positions: Right winger; right midfielder; attacking midfielder

Team information
- Current team: Bologna
- Number: 10

Youth career
- 2000–2001: Atletico Carrara
- 2001–2003: Ponzano
- 2003–2013: Fiorentina

Senior career*
Years	Team	Apps	(Gls)
2013–2017	Fiorentina	72	(14)
2013–2014	→ Crotone (loan)	38	(12)
2017–2022	Juventus	134	(8)
2022–2025	Toronto FC	88	(25)
2025–	Bologna	39	(7)

International career
2011–2012	Italy U18	7	(0)
2013	Italy U19	1	(0)
2013–2015	Italy U20	2	(0)
2014–2017	Italy U21	16	(5)
2016–2022	Italy	39	(6)
Medal record
Men's Football
Representing Italy
UEFA European Championship
Winner	2020 Europe
UEFA Nations League
Third place	2021 Italy
CONMEBOL–UEFA Cup of Champions
Runner-up	2022 England
- * Club domestic league appearances and goals as of 16:03, 31 October 2026 (UTC)

Federico Bernardeschi (Note: Italian pronunciation: [fedeˈriːko bernarˈdeski]) (born 16 February 1994) is an Italian professional footballer who plays as a right winger or attacking midfielder for Serie A club Bologna. His nickname is "Brunelleschi", after the famous Florentine architect, for his technique and elegance on the pitch.

Bernardeschi began his playing career with Atletico Carrara and Polisportiva Ponzano. In 2003, he moved to the Fiorentina youth system, where he spent ten years, before spending one season on loan at Crotone during the 2013–14 season. He returned to Fiorentina the following season. In July 2017, he was sold to Juventus, with whom he won three consecutive Serie A titles, among other trophies. In July 2022, upon the expiration of his contract with Juventus, Bernardeschi became a free agent and signed with Toronto FC.

At international level, Bernardeschi has represented Italy at youth level since 2011, eventually making his senior debut in 2016, and was a member of the nation's squads at UEFA Euro 2016 and UEFA Euro 2020, winning the latter tournament.

== Club career ==
=== Early career ===
Bernardeschi began playing football at age six with Atletico Carrara. A year later he transferred to Ponzano, a football school of Empoli, before arriving at Fiorentina, who assigned him to the "Pulcini" age group at the age of nine in 2003.

After passing through the ranks of the Fiorentina youth system, he spent the 2013–14 season on loan at Crotone in Serie B. He made his professional debut at 19 years old, on 8 September 2013 against Pescara, when he entered the field after 75 minutes, replacing Soufiane Bidaoui. At the end of the season Bernareschi scored 12 goals in 39 appearances and Crotone exercised the option to acquire half the player's contract in co-ownership.

In 2019, Bernardeschi revealed that he used to struggle with heart problems at around the age of 16.

=== Fiorentina ===
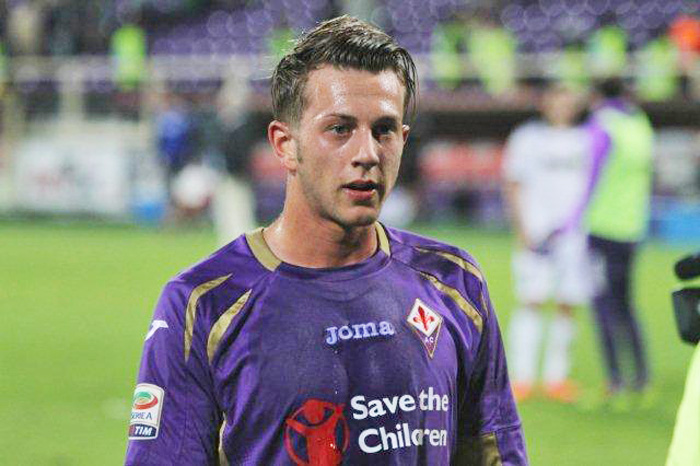
Bernardeschi with Fiorentina in 2014

On 20 June 2014, Fiorentina officially redeemed Crotone's half of Bernardeschi's contract, and he was inserted into the first team under the direction of Vincenzo Montella. During the 2014–15 season he obtained 10 appearances and three goals in all competitions, partially hampered by a fracture to his ankle which kept him out from November 2014. He made his Serie A debut on 14 September 2014, at the age of 20, coming off the bench in the 57th minute of a 0–0 home draw against Genoa. Four days later, he made his debut in European debut in a 3–0 home win over Guingamp in the Europa League, in which he also scored his first goal for the club. After returning to the team following his injury, he scored his first goal in Serie A on the final matchday of the season, in a 3–0 home win over Chievo on 31 May 2015.

He was awarded the number 10 shirt at the start of the 2015–16 season, previously worn by the likes of Giancarlo Antognoni and Roberto Baggio. On 26 November 2015, Bernardeschi scored two goals in a 2–2 away draw against Basel in the Europa League group stage. On 6 February 2016, Bernardeschi scored his second goal in Serie A, during a 1–1 away draw against Bologna.

=== Juventus ===
==== 2017–18 season ====
On 24 July 2017, Bernardeschi was signed by Juventus, one of Fiorentina's main rivals, for €40 million on a five-year deal. Although he was named as a possible candidate for the number 10 shirt in the media, he eventually chose the number 33, stating: "The No. 10 is a number I like but I'll need to earn it. Taking the No. 33 is the correct choice at this point." On 13 August, he made his club debut, coming on as a substitute in a 3–2 defeat to Lazio in the 2017 Supercoppa Italiana. He made his UEFA Champions League debut on 12 September, coming on as a second-half substitute for Rodrigo Bentancur in a 3–0 away loss to Barcelona. On 1 October, he made his first start for Juventus, and scored his first goal for the club, also assisting another for Gonzalo Higuaín, in a 2–2 away draw against Atalanta. He scored his first Champions League goal on 5 December, after coming off the bench, netting his club's second goal in a 2–0 away win over Olympiacos; the result allowed Juventus to advance to the knock-out stages of the competition. On 9 February 2018, Bernardeschi returned to Florence, receiving vulgar insults from home fans throughout the match; he scored a free kick in the second half to silence the crowd.

==== 2018–2022 ====
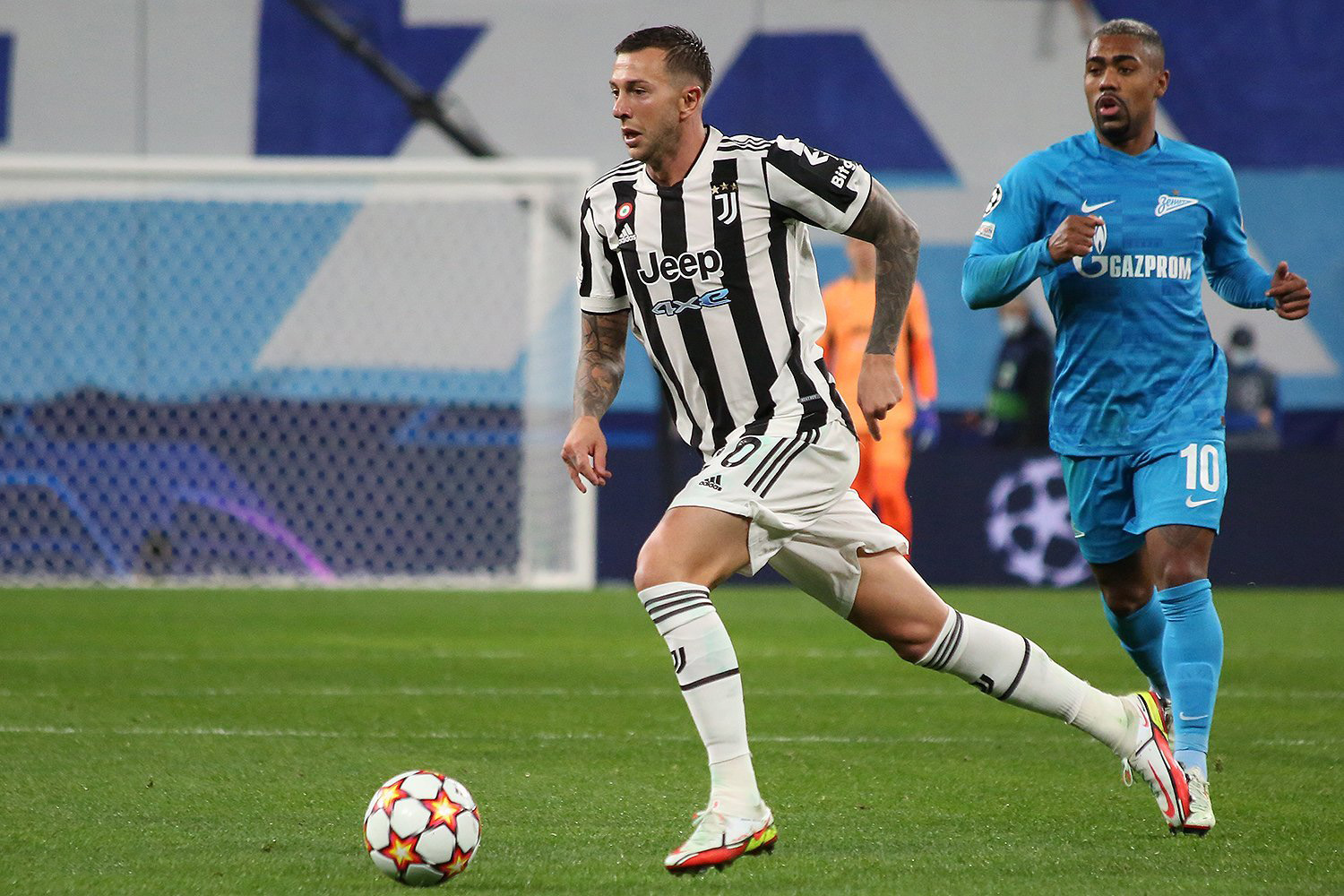
Bernardeschi playing for Juventus in 2021

Bernardeschi scored his first goal of the 2018–19 season in Juventus's opening Serie A match on 18 August 2018, netting the winner in a 3–2 away victory over Chievo in injury time. On 12 March 2019, Bernardeschi made a great sprint that resulted in a penalty kick in a 3–0 win over Atlético Madrid in the Champions League. In that match, he also made an assist.

On 4 July 2020, Bernardeschi made his 100th appearance for Juventus in a 4–1 home win over rivals Torino in Serie A. On 26 July, he scored his first and only league goal of the season in a 2–0 home win over Sampdoria, which allowed Juventus to clinch the Serie A title.

During the second-half of the 2020–21 season under new manager Andrea Pirlo, Bernardeschi was converted into a full-back for Juventus after excelling in the position in a Coppa Italia win against Genoa on 13 January 2021.

=== Toronto FC ===
On 15 July 2022, Bernardeschi signed for Major League Soccer club Toronto FC as a designated player on a four-year contract; he reunited with compatriots Lorenzo Insigne and Domenico Criscito. He made his debut for the club on 23 July, in a 4–0 home victory against Charlotte FC. Bernardeschi assisted the second goal of the match scored by Michael Bradley and scored the third goal of the match, despite only featuring in the opening half. The performance earned him a spot on the MLS Team of the Week. In the 2022 Canadian Championship final against the Vancouver Whitecaps three days later at BC Place, he set-up Lukas MacNaughton's temporary equaliser in the second half with a trivela cross to tie the game 1–1; he later converted a penalty in the resulting shoot-out, although Toronto ultimately lost 5–3. On 1 April 2023, he scored directly from a corner kick (an Olympico) against Charlotte FC in a 2–2 home draw. The goal earned Bernardeschi Goal of the Matchday honours.

On 18 May 2024, Bernardeschi scored his first MLS hat-trick against rivals CF Montréal in a 5–1 win, after returning from a mid-week suspension. On 1 July 2025, it was announced that Toronto had terminated his contract by mutual agreement.

=== Bologna ===
On 19 July 2025, Bernardeschi returned to Italy and signed with Bologna as a free agent.

== International career ==
=== Youth ===
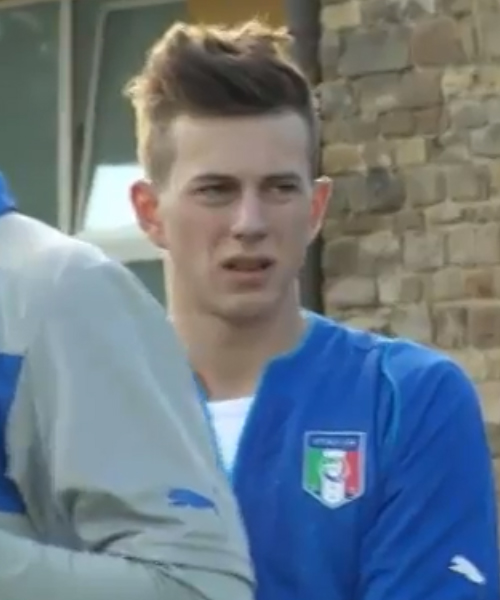
Bernardeschi with Italy U21 in 2014

On 5 March 2014, he made his debut with the Italy under-21, in a Euro 2015 qualifying match against Northern Ireland. He took part at the 2015 UEFA European Under-21 Championship under manager Luigi Di Biagio.

In June 2017, he was included in the Italy under-21 squad for the 2017 UEFA European Under-21 Championship by manager Di Biagio. In Italy's final group match on 24 June, Bernardeschi score the only goal in a 1–0 win over eventual champions Germany, which allowed Italy to advanced to the semi-finals of the competition. Italy were eliminated by Spain in the semi-finals on 27 June, following a 3–1 defeat, with Bernardeschi scoring Italy's temporary equaliser. He was named to the team of the tournament for his performances.

=== Senior ===
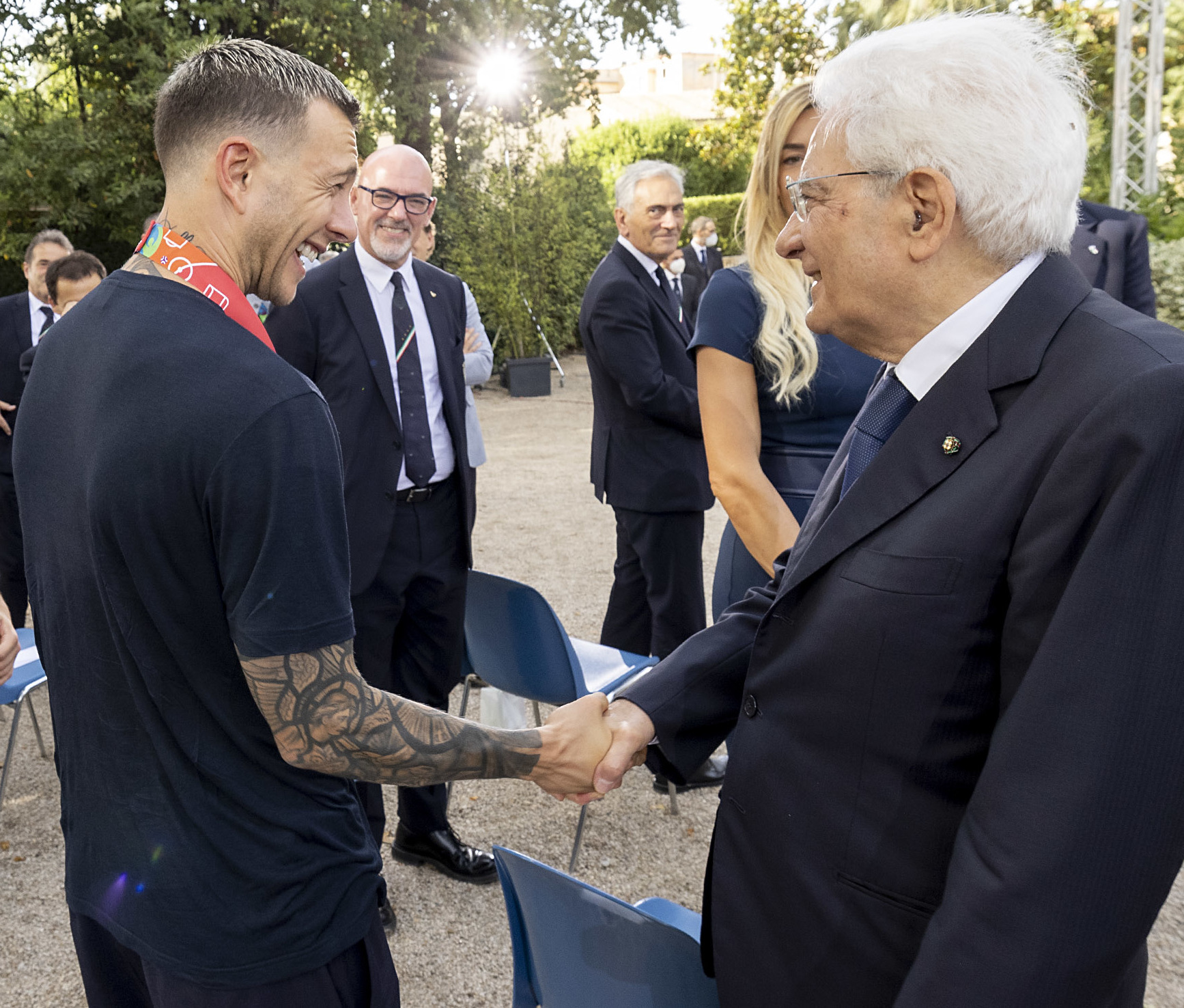
Bernardeschi (left) greeting Sergio Mattarella (right), President of Italy, in Rome, following Italy's UEFA Euro 2020 win

From 10 to 12 March 2014, Bernardeschi was called up to the senior national team by coach Cesare Prandelli as part of an internship to evaluate young players ahead of the 2014 FIFA World Cup, confirmed on the next meeting between 14 and 15 April.

Bernardeschi received his first official call up to the Italy senior squad by manager Antonio Conte in March 2016 for friendlies against Spain and Germany. He made his international debut for Italy on 24 March, coming on as a substitute in a 1–1 home draw against Spain, and was involved in Lorenzo Insigne's goal. On 31 May, he was named to Conte's 23-man Italy squad for UEFA Euro 2016. He made his only appearance of the tournament on 22 June, in Italy's final group match, which ended in a 1–0 defeat to Ireland. He scored his first senior international goal on 11 June 2017, in a 5–0 home win over Liechtenstein in a 2018 World Cup qualifier.

On 12 October 2019, Bernardeschi scored in a 2–0 home win over Greece, which sealed Italy's qualification for Euro 2020.

In June 2021, Bernardeschi was included in Italy's squad for UEFA Euro 2020 by manager Roberto Mancini. On 6 July, following a 1–1 draw after extra-time against Spain in the semi-final of the competition, Bernardeschi converted his spot-kick in an eventual 4–2 penalty shoot-out victory, to send Italy to the final. On 11 July, Bernardeschi won the European Championship with Italy following a 3–2 penalty shoot-out victory over England at Wembley Stadium in the final, after a 1–1 draw in extra-time; during the match, he replaced the injured Federico Chiesa late on in the second half, towards the end of regulation time, and later scored Italy's fourth spot-kick (which ended up being the game-winning penalty after teammate Jorginho and England's Jadon Sancho and Bukayo Saka all missed their spot-kicks) in the shoot-out.

== Style of play ==
A quick, strong, creative, technically gifted, and hard-working player, with a good positional sense and an eye for goal, Bernardeschi was regarded as one of Italy's most exciting and talented prospects. A predominantly left-footed player, known in particular for his pace, agility, and dribbling ability, as well as his powerful and accurate striking ability from outside the area, as well as his ability to make late attacking runs into the box. His preferred role is as a right winger or outside forward in a 4–3–3 formation, a position which allows him to beat opponents, cut into the centre, and either shoot towards goal or link-up with midfielders and create chances for teammates with his stronger left foot; he is also capable of playing on the left flank. Although he often serves as a link between the forwards and midfielders, due to his tactical versatility, intelligence, stamina, vision and defensive work-rate, as well as his technical, athletic, and physical attributes, he is also capable of playing in several other positions, and has been deployed as a second striker or inside forward, as an attacking midfielder, in a central role as a classic number 10 playmaker behind the forwards (known as the trequartista role, in Italian), in particular under his Juventus manager Maurizio Sarri, in a deeper midfield role as an offensive-minded central midfielder (known as the mezzala role, in Italian), further up the pitch as an outright forward, as a false 9, or even as a wide midfielder, full-back, or wing-back along the right side of the pitch. (Note: See) He is also known for his accuracy from set-pieces and penalties. He has cited compatriots Francesco Totti, Giancarlo Antognoni, Roberto Baggio, and Alessandro Del Piero as his footballing idols and role models; his role on the pitch and style of play have also led pundits to compare Bernardeschi to these aforementioned players as well as Michel Platini. He has also described Ukrainian former striker Andriy Shevchenko as one of his major influences in his youth. Due to his technique and elegant playing style, Bernardeschi has been nicknamed Brunelleschi, as a reference to the famous Italian Renaissance designer and architect from Florence.

While Bernardeschi has largely drawn praise in the media for his ability, talent, and playing style, in July 2017, following rumours of Bernardeschi's possible transfer to Fiorentina's rivals Juventus, and the possibility of him inheriting the club's number 10 shirt, former Italy manager Arrigo Sacchi stated in an interview that although he felt Bernardeschi had "enormous potential", he also believed he needed to improve in certain aspects of his game; he commented: "He [Bernardeschi] doesn't use his right [foot] much and he needs to improve in that, if you only have one foot you risk being predictable and the opposition can shut you down more easily. I'd say he dribbles well, he takes on a defender and goes past them with agility and imagination. He also has a good shot on him, he sees the goal, takes aim and the result is always dangerous. A great player? Calm down, calm down. I'm describing a lad with notable talents, but one who has to mature and be helped. For example, he has to learn how to get into the rhythm of the game with consistency. To be great, you need to have an understanding with your team. [...] Bernardeschi needs to do better in that regard, less individual technique and more collective technique." Sacchi later also added: "He's still a lad, they need to help him and have patience with him. The important thing is not to play the game of comparisons. Bernardeschi is not Del Piero and he's not Roberto Baggio. They were more at the centre of things, while Bernardeschi moves on the wing." His decision-making has also been cited by pundits as an area in which he needs to improve as he gains experience.

== Personal life ==
In May 2019, Bernardeschi's partner Veronica Ciardi gave birth to their daughter named Deva. In May 2021, the couple welcomed their second daughter, Lena. On 13 July 2021, the day of Veronica's birthday, the couple got married, two days after Italy's Euro 2020 triumph. The marriage took place in the Carrara Cathedral, in Bernardeschi's city of birth.

== Career statistics ==
=== Club ===
As of match played 31 October 2026

Appearances and goals by club, season and competition
Club	Season	League			National cup (Note: Includes Coppa Italia, Canadian Championship)		Continental		Other		Total	
Club	Season	Division	Apps	Goals	Apps	Goals	Apps	Goals	Apps	Goals	Apps	Goals
Fiorentina	2014–15	Serie A	7	1	0	0	3 (Note: Appearances in UEFA Europa League)	2	—		10	3
Fiorentina	2015–16	Serie A	33	2	1	0	7	4	—		41	6
Fiorentina	2016–17	Serie A	32	11	2	1	8	2	—		42	14
Fiorentina	Total		72	14	3	1	18	8	—		93	23
Crotone (loan)	2013–14	Serie B	38	12	0	0	—		1 (Note: Appearance in Serie B promotion play-offs)	0	39	12
Juventus	2017–18	Serie A	22	4	3	0	5 (Note: Appearances in UEFA Champions League)	1	1 (Note: Appearance in Supercoppa Italiana)	0	31	5
Juventus	2018–19	Serie A	28	2	2	1	8	0	1	0	39	3
Juventus	2019–20	Serie A	29	1	3	0	6	1	0	0	38	2
Juventus	2020–21	Serie A	27	0	4	0	7	0	1	0	39	0
Juventus	2021–22	Serie A	28	1	2	1	5	0	1	0	36	2
Juventus	Total		134	8	14	2	31	2	4	0	183	12
Toronto FC	2022	MLS	13	8	1	0	—		—		14	8
Toronto FC	2023	MLS	31	5	1	0	—		1 (Note: Appearance(s) in Leagues Cup)	0	33	5
Toronto FC	2024	MLS	29	8	5	1	—		3	0	37	9
Toronto FC	2025	MLS	15	4	0	0	—		—		15	4
Toronto FC	Total		88	25	7	1	—		4	0	99	26
Bologna	2025–26	Serie A	29	4	2	0	13 (Note: Appearances in UEFA Europa League)	5	1	0	45	9
Bologna	2026–27	Serie A	10	3	0	0	—		—		10	3
Bologna	Total		39	7	2	0	13	5	1	0	55	12
Career total			371	66	26	4	62	15	10	0	469	85

=== International ===
Appearances and goals by national team and year
National team	Year	Apps	Goals
Italy	2016	7	0
Italy	2017	6	1
Italy	2018	3	1
Italy	2019	8	2
Italy	2020	3	1
Italy	2021	11	1
Italy	2022	1	0
Total		39	6

Scores and results list Italy's goal tally first, score column indicates score after each Bernardeschi goal.

List of international goals scored by Federico Bernardeschi
No.	Date	Venue	Cap	Opponent	Score	Result	Competition
1	11 June 2017	Stadio Friuli, Udine, Italy	9	Liechtenstein	4–0	5–0	2018 FIFA World Cup qualification
2	10 October 2018	Stadio Luigi Ferraris, Genoa, Italy	15	Ukraine	1–0	1–1	Friendly
3	12 October 2019	Stadio Olimpico, Rome, Italy	22	Greece	2–0	2–0	UEFA Euro 2020 qualification
4	15 October 2019	Rheinpark Stadion, Vaduz, Liechtenstein	23	Liechtenstein	1–0	5–0	UEFA Euro 2020 qualification
5	11 November 2020	Stadio Artemio Franchi, Florence, Italy	25	Estonia	2–0	4–0	Friendly
6	28 May 2021	Sardegna Arena, Cagliari, Italy	30	San Marino	1–0	7–0	Friendly

== Honours ==
Juventus

- Serie A: 2017–18, 2018–19, 2019–20
- Coppa Italia: 2017–18, 2020–21
- Supercoppa Italiana: 2018, 2020

Italy

- UEFA European Championship: 2020
- UEFA Nations League third place: 2020–21

Individual

- MLS All-Star: 2024
- AIAC Football Leader Under-21 Award: 2015–16
- UEFA European Under-21 Championship Team of the Tournament: 2017
- Red Patch Boys Player of the Year: 2022, 2024

Orders

- 5th Class / Knight: Cavaliere Ordine al Merito della Repubblica Italiana: 2021
