= Steven Caldwell =

Scottish footballer, coach, and executive

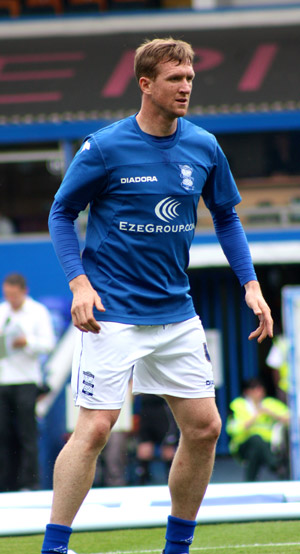
- Caldwell in 2012 pre-season with Birmingham

Personal information
- Full name: Steven Caldwell
- Date of birth: 12 September 1980 (age 46)
- Place of birth: Stirling, Scotland
- Height: 6 ft 0 in (1.83 m)
- Position: Defender

Youth career
- Hutchison Vale
- –1997: Newcastle United

Senior career*
Years	Team	Apps	(Gls)
1997–2004	Newcastle United	28	(1)
2001	→ Blackpool (loan)	6	(0)
2001–2002	→ Bradford City (loan)	5	(0)
2002	→ Bradford City (loan)	4	(0)
2004	→ Leeds United (loan)	13	(1)
2004–2007	Sunderland	76	(4)
2007–2010	Burnley	104	(5)
2010–2011	Wigan Athletic	10	(0)
2011–2013	Birmingham City	77	(1)
2013	→ Toronto FC (loan)	6	(0)
2013–2015	Toronto FC	40	(1)
Total		369	(13)

International career
2000–2003	Scotland U21	10	(0)
2001–2011	Scotland	12	(0)
2002–2003	Scotland B	3	(0)

Managerial career
- 2019–2021: Canada (assistant)
- * Club domestic league appearances and goals

Steven Caldwell (born 12 September 1980) is a Scottish former footballer, coach, and executive. Playing as a defender, mostly as a centre back, Caldwell won 12 caps for the Scotland national team and has played over 300 league matches in his career, primarily in the top three tiers of English football. Since retiring from playing, he has been working as a Major League Soccer analyst for TSN in Canada.

Caldwell is the president of League1 Ontario club Oakville Blue Devils FC and has served as the assistant coach of the Canada national team.

His younger brother Gary was also a defender and Scotland international and is currently the manager of Wigan Athletic.

== Club career ==
=== Newcastle United ===
Born in Stirling, Scotland, Caldwell started out his football career at Hutchison Vale, along with his younger brother Gary. He then joined Premiership club Newcastle United at age fourteen, along with Gary, where they began their football careers. In 1998, Caldwell signed his first professional contract with the club. At some point in the 1999–00 season, he was promoted to the first team, appearing twice as an unused substitute.

In the 2000–01 season, Caldwell was called up to the first team, with Manager Bobby Robson said: "Caldwell's got a good pedigree. I like to put people in when it's right and when it's necessary and I can afford to do it, and not when we are forced to do it. But we are going to have the confidence with the lad to do it. He's a steady character, has indomitable spirit and we like him very much." Caldwell made his Newcastle United debut on 30 September 2000 against Manchester City, coming on as a second half substitute for Andy Griffin, and played the rest of the game, keeping a clean sheet, in a 1–0 win. On 1 November 2000, he made his first start for the club against Bradford City in the League Cup and scored his first goal for Newcastle United, as they won 4–3. Since making his debut for the club, Caldwell rotated in and out of the first team, due to facing competitions in the defence. He went on to feature four more times for Newcastle United by the end of the year, making three starts. On 3 March 2001 Caldwell made his first appearances in two months following a thigh injury, playing the whole match in a 1–1 draw against Everton. He later made two additional appearances before the end of the 2000–01 season, finishing the campaign with a total of nine appearances in all competitions.

At the start of the 2001–02 season, Caldwell was featured three times in Newcastle United's matches in the UEFA Intertoto Cup and once set up a goal, in a 4–0 win against Lokeren on 14 July 2001. Due to lack of first team football opportunities, he was loaned out to Blackpool on a month's loan. Caldwell made his debut for the club, starting the whole game, in a 2–1 win against Colchester United on 13 October 2001. In a follow–up match, he scored his first career goal, against Stoke City in the Football League Trophy, winning 3–2. Caldwell made a total of six appearances for Blackpool before returning to his parent club a month later.

Shortly after, Caldwell was loaned out to Bradford City on a month's loan in December 2001. He made his debut for the club, starting the whole game, in a 3–1 win against Rotherham United on 8 December 2001. Since making his debut for Bradford City, Caldwell quickly became a first team regular for the side for the next two months there and had his loan spell extended at the club along the way. His loan spell at Bradford City ended in late–January, as he made nine appearances for the side.

At the start of the 2002–03 season, Caldwell continued to find his first team opportunities limited at Newcastle United, due to competitions in the central defence, with Manager Robson challenging him to fight for his first team place at the club. On 2 November 2002 he was called up to the first team and made his first appearance of the season, coming against Middlesbrough in the league and scored his first goal of the season, in a 2–0 win. Caldwell then made his UEFA Champions League debut against Inter Milan on 27 November 2002, coming on as an 86th-minute substitute, as Newcastle United lost 4–1. He then made six more starts for the club by the end of the year. Because of injuries to Andy O'Brien and Titus Bramble, Caldwell appeared three times at the beginning of January, including helping Newcastle United keep two consecutive clean sheets. However, he was dropped from the first team for the next two months, due to illness and competitions. In between the absence, Caldwell made his first UEFA Champions League start against Bayer Leverkusen, as the club won 3–1 on 26 February 2003. He later made four more appearances later in the 2002–03 season and contributed to the club's UEFA Champions League qualification to next season. In total, Caldwell made seventeen appearances and scoring once in all competitions. Local newspaper Evening Chronicle said his involvement in the first team "deserves credit for his unsung contribution"

With his contract expiring at the end of the 2002–03 season, Caldwell said about his future, saying: "I've been in a worse position at this club. I'm not expecting anything at the moment. If the club wants me to stay, I'll be delighted, but I'm 22 and I don't want to spend my time in the reserves. I want to be playing for my country and I won't be doing that if I'm in the reserves." Newcastle United offered a him a new contract, but he rejected it, with clubs like Rangers, Sunderland and Sporting CP were interested in signing him. With an imminent departure from Newcastle United, the club demanded a £750,000 compensation. But in an unexpected turn of an event, it was announced on 19 June 2003 that Caldwell signed a one–year contract extension with the club, having previously rejected the one before, describing it as an "insult".

On 15 October 2003 Caldwell made his first appearance of the 2003–04 season, coming on as a 78th-minute substitute, in a 1–0 win against NAC Breda in the UEFA Cup, a win that saw Newcastle United through to the next round of the tournament following a 6–0 win on aggregate. He then made three more appearances for the club in the first half of the season. Manager Robson praised his performance in the last two matches. However, Caldwell continued to found his first team opportunities limited, due to competitions and his own injury concern. Because of this, Caldwell wanted to leave Newcastle United if he was not given first team football at the club. At one point, Caldwell was expected to leave Newcastle United on loan but Manager Robson blocked any attempts following an injury of Jonathan Woodgate. After Newcastle United recalled him due to an injury of Woodgate and Griffin, he made his appearances for the club since leaving, coming against Wolverhampton Wanderers on 9 May 2004. Caldwell appeared in the last two matches of the 2003–04 season, as Newcastle United failed to qualify for the UEFA Champions League next season. In total at the club, he made a total of seven appearances in all competitions.

On 2 February 2004, Caldwell joined fellow Premiership club Leeds United on loan as part of a loan swap for Michael Bridges who went in the opposite direction. He made his debut for the club, starting the whole game, in a 2–0 loss against Aston Villa five days later on 7 February 2004. Since joining Leeds United, Caldwell became a first team regular, playing in the centre–back position, as he attempt to help the club avoid relegation once again. On 10 April 2004 Caldwell scored his first goal for Leeds United, in a 2–1 win against Blackburn Rovers. However, he was recalled by his parent club on 5 May 2004. By the time Caldwell was recalled, he made thirteen appearances and scoring once in all competitions. Following his absence, Leeds United was eventually relegated to the Championship.

Once the 2003–04 season was concluded, Caldwell was released by Newcastle United and by the time he left the club, he made thirty–seven appearances and scoring two times in all competitions.

=== Sunderland ===
Throughout the 2003–04 season, Sunderland wanted to sign Caldwell after their efforts to sign him, both on a free transfer and on loan failed. The club opted to wait to sign him on a free transfer at the end of the 2003–04 season. In May 2004, he agreed a move to Sunderland after leaving Newcastle United. The move was later confirmed on 27 June 2004, with the player signed a three–year contract.

After missing out the first match of the 2004–05 season, Caldwell made his debut for the club, starting the whole game, in a 3–1 win against Crewe Alexandra on 10 August 2004. This was followed up by scoring his first goal for Sunderland, in a 3–3 draw against Queens Park Rangers. Since making his debut for the club, Caldwell became was known for his whole-hearted approach to the game and the solid partnership he formed with Gary Breen. Caldwell said that his aim was to help Sunderland reach the promotion to the Premiership, in which Manager McCarthy praised Caldwell for his effort. However, during a 1–1 draw against Wigan Athletic on 28 August 2004, he suffered a knock and was substituted in the 25th minute as a result. After missing one match, Caldwell returned to the starting line–up against Gillingham on 10 September 2004 and kept a clean sheet, in a 4–0 win. On 13 November 2004 he scored his second goal for the club, in a 1–0 win against Leicester City. This was followed up by helping Sunderland keep two clean sheets in the next two matches, making it three in a row. However in a follow–up against West Ham United, Caldwell was sent–off in the 41st minute after clashing with Serhii Rebrov, as the club lost 2–0. After the match, Sunderland successfully appealed against his red card. However, his return was short–lived when he suffered a hamstring injury that saw him miss one match. Despite not risking Caldwell return ahead of the match against Leeds United on 26 December 2004, he returned to the starting line–up, as the club lost 3–2. However, his return was short–lived when Caldwell suffered a calf injury that saw him miss two matches. On 4 February 2005 he returned to the starting line–up against Wolverhampton Wanderers. Caldwell then scored his third goal of the season, as well as, setting up Sunderland's first goal of the game, in a 5–1 win against Plymouth Argyle on 13 March 2005. Despite facing the sidelined during the 2004–05 season, he continued to regain his first team place, playing in the centre–back position for the rest of the season, as the club continued aiming to reach promotion to the Premiership. On 23 April 2005, Caldwell scored Sunderland's winning goal against Leicester City to send his team back to the Premiership, which he successfully predicted. He later said it was the best moment as a footballer. In his first season at the club, Caldwell went on to make forty–one appearances and scoring four times in all competitions.

Ahead of the 2005–06 season, Caldwell said that he couldn't wait to play in Premiership now that Sunderland has returned to the top–flight league. Caldwell made his first Premiership appearance in a year, starting the whole game, as the club lost 3–1 against Charlton Athletic in the opening game of the season. However, he missed the next six matches, due to competition in the defence. Caldwell returned to the starting line–up against Middlesbrough on 25 September 2005, as Sunderland won 2–0, giving their first Premier League since 2002. He regained his first team place in the defence for the next five matches, including setting up a goal against Arsenal on 5 November 2005. This lasted until Caldwell was dropped from the first team in the next two matches. On 30 November 2005 he returned to the starting line–up, in a 2–0 loss against Liverpool. Following his return, Caldwell regained his first team place and started in the next nine matches for Sunderland. Along the way, he received a straight red card in the 60th minute in a 2–1 loss against Fulham on 2 January 2006 after "tripping Heiðar Helguson after the Icelandic international had embarrassingly broken the offside trap". The club's appeal was unsuccessful and Caldwell had to serve a one-match suspension. Having picked up five yellow cards, he, once again, suspended for one match before not playing for the next three matches. O 11 March 2006 Caldwell returned to the starting line–up against Wigan Athletic and wore the club's captaincy in the absence of Breen, as they lost 1–0. He then captained the side on two more occasions. Caldwell continued to rotate in and out of the starting line–up for the rest of the 2005–06 season, as Sunderland were relegated again in the 2005–06 season. At the end of the 2005–06 season, he went on to make twenty–six appearances in all competitions.

Ahead of the 2006–07 season, Caldwell was plagued with a knee injury that saw him sidelined for a month. He was tipped to become the next Sunderland captain following the departure of Breen and was eventually appointed. Caldwell captained in the opening game of the season against Coventry City., as the club lost 2–1. In a follow–up match against Birmingham City, he " sprained the medial ligaments in his knee " that saw him substituted in the 29th minute, as Sunderland lost 1–0. After the match, Caldwell was sidelined for almost three months. On 4 November 2006 he returned to the starting line–up against Norwich City, as the club lost 1–0. Despite keen to impress new Manager Roy Keane, Caldwell, however, fall out of favour with him, and he rarely featured in Roy Keane's first team when fit. Nevertheless, Caldwell was later featured eight times since returning before suffering a thigh injury that saw him substituted in the 16th-minute substitute, in a 1–0 loss against Preston North End on 30 December 2006. In the January transfer window, he was linked with a move away from the club: Sunderland accepted bids from Championship rivals Burnley and Coventry City. It came after when Manager Keane revealed that the contract talk between the club and Caldwell collapsed. Caldwell was then stripped of Sunderland's captaincy due to his imminent departure from the club.

=== Burnley ===
It was agreed on 25 January 2007 that Burnley agreed to sign Caldwell from Sunderland. However, the move was in doubt and expected to see out his contract for the rest of the 2006–07 season. But the move was back and it was completed minutes before the transfer deadline in January 2007. He signed a three-and-a-half-year deal at Turf Moor for an initial £200,000, with a further £200,000 would be payable to Sunderland at a later date.

Caldwell made his Burnley debut, starting the whole game, in a 3–1 loss against Queens Park Rangers on 3 February 2007. After the match, Manager Steve Cotterill praised his debut performance. This was followed up by captaining the club for the first time against Sheffield Wednesday, as they drew 1–1. Since making his debut for Burnley, he quickly became a first team for the side, playing in the centre–back position. Caldwell was also named as the club's captain and endeared himself to the team's fans with his uncompromising tackling and commitment. He then helped Burnley keep four consecutive clean sheets between 31 March 2007 and 9 April 2007. At the end of the 2006–07 season, Caldwell made seventeen appearances in all competitions.

In the opening game of the 2007–08 season against West Bromwich Albion, however, Caldwell suffered a hamstring injury and was substituted in the 31st minute, as Burnley lost 1–0. On 29 August 2007 he returned to the starting line–up against Oldham Athletic in the second round of the League Cup, as the club won 3–0. Following this return, Caldwell regained his first team place in the centre–back and his captaincy for the next eight matches. This lasted until he suffered two separate injuries that saw him out for a month. On 22 December 2007 Caldwell returned to the starting line–up against Ipswich Town and kept a clean sheet, as the club drew 0–0. Following his return, he resumed his duties as the captain, as well as, his first team place in the centre–back position. On 26 February 2008 Caldwell scored his first goal of the season, as well as, setting up Burnley's first goal of the game, in a 2–0 win against Coventry City. However, he was sent–off in a match for a second bookable offence against Hull City on 4 March 2008, as the club lost 2–0. After serving a one match suspension, Caldwell returned to the starting line–up against local rivals Preston North End on 22 March 2008, coming on as a second-half substitute, in a 2–1 loss. He then scored his second goal of the season, in a 1–0 win against Southampton on 19 April 2008. At the end of the 2007–08 season, Caldwell went on to make thirty–two appearances and scoring two times in all competitions.

At the start of the 2008–09 season, Caldwell continued to establish himself in the first team, playing in the centre–back position, as well as, resuming his captain duties for Burnley. He stated that his aim was to help the club reach the Premier League next season. Caldwell helped Burnley keep three consecutive clean sheets between 23 August 2008 and 30 August 2008. On 27 September 2008 Caldwell scored his first goal of the season, in a 3–1 win against Preston North End. During a 1–1 draw against Charlton Athletic on 25 October 2008, he suffered a hip injury that saw him substituted in the 51st minute. But Caldwell quickly recovered from the injury and returned to the starting line–up against Reading on 28 October 2008, as the club won 1–0. Prior to the match against Chelsea in the Round of 16 of the League Cup, Caldwell said he wanted the opposition team to field in stronger players, saying: "I really hope they play their best team against us because you want to play against the very best. I'm sure they'll play a strong team, they seem to have been doing it in other rounds of the cup and you want to play against people like Nicolas Anelka, John Terry and Frank Lampard because they're at the very top of football." However in a match, he captained Burnley throughout the match to extra time until his sending off in the 116th minute for a second bookable offence, as the club won 5–4 in the penalty shootout following a 1–1 draw. After serving a one match suspension, Caldwell returned to the starting line–up against Doncaster Rovers on 22 November 2008 and helped Burnley keep a clean sheet, in a 0–0 draw. Once again, he received a straight red card after dragging Richie Wellens back inside the area, in a 2–1 loss against Doncaster Rovers on 28 December 2008. After serving a two match suspension, Caldwell returned to the starting line–up against Swansea City on 10 January 2009, as the club lost 2–0. On 21 March 2009 Caldwell scored his second goal of the season, in a 2–1 win against Plymouth Argyle. He then helped the club reach the play–offs after beating Bristol City 4–0 in the last game of the season. Caldwell then helped Burnley beat Reading 3–0 in the semi–finals of the Football League Championship play-off to reach the final. The highlight of Caldwell's Burnley career was lifting the Football League Championship play-off trophy as captain after beating Sheffield United 1–0 to play in the Premier League next season. However, he expressed mixed emotions, due to his former club, Newcastle United, being relegated. At the end of the 2008–09 season, Caldwell made 57 starts throughout the season, as the Scottish international was a virtual ever-present in the Clarets back-line.

However at the start of the 2009–10 season, Caldwell suffered a groin injury while on international duty and was sidelined for a month. After making a recovery, he returned to the substitute bench for a match against Tottenham Hotspur and didn't make a return on 3 October 2009, starting the whole game, in a 2–1 win against Birmingham City. Following his return, Caldwell regained his first team place, starting seven matches between 18 October 2009 and 20 December 2009. He scored his first goal for the club, scoring from a header, in a 1–1 draw against Aston Villa on 21 November 2009. In a follow–up match against West Ham United, Caldwell received a straight red card for "hauling down Zavon Hines", as Burnley lost 5–3. After serving a one match suspension, Caldwell returned to the starting line–up against Fulham on 12 December 2009, as the club drew 1–1. However during a 2–0 loss against Wolverhampton Wanderers on 20 December 2009, he suffered a groin injury and was substituted in the 67th minute. After the match, it was announced that Caldwell was eventually sidelined for three months. On 10 April 2010 he returned to the first team, coming on as an 85th-minute substitute, in a 4–1 win against Hull City. Caldwell was later featured three more matches in the remaining matches of the 2009–10 season, including captaining against Tottenham Hotspur in the last game of the season, as the club were relegated from the Premier League.

Having made thirteen appearances and scoring once in all competitions, he was released by Burnley at the end of his contract following the 2009–10 season.

=== Wigan Athletic ===
On 23 August 2010, he signed a one-year deal with Wigan Athletic, again joining up with his brother Gary, having trained with the club earlier this month.

He made his debut for Wigan Athletic on 24 August 2010, a day after signing, against Hartlepool United in the League Cup second round match, playing the full 90 minutes in a 3–0 victory. Caldwell made his league debut for the club on 16 October 2010 away against Newcastle United, his former club, at St James Park in a 2–2 draw as Newcastle United came from 2–0 down to gain a point. However, he found himself placed on the substitute bench for most of the season. At times, Caldwell was called up to the starting line–up following Wigan's defensive crisis. For the first time in their professional club career, the Caldwell brothers played together in a centre–back against Arsenal on 22 January 2011, in a 3–0 loss. They later played together on two occasions, coming against West Bromwich Albion and Bolton Wanderers. At the end of the 2010–11 season, he went on to make fifteen appearances in all competitions.

Following this, Caldwell was released when his contract expired at the end of the season.

=== Birmingham City ===
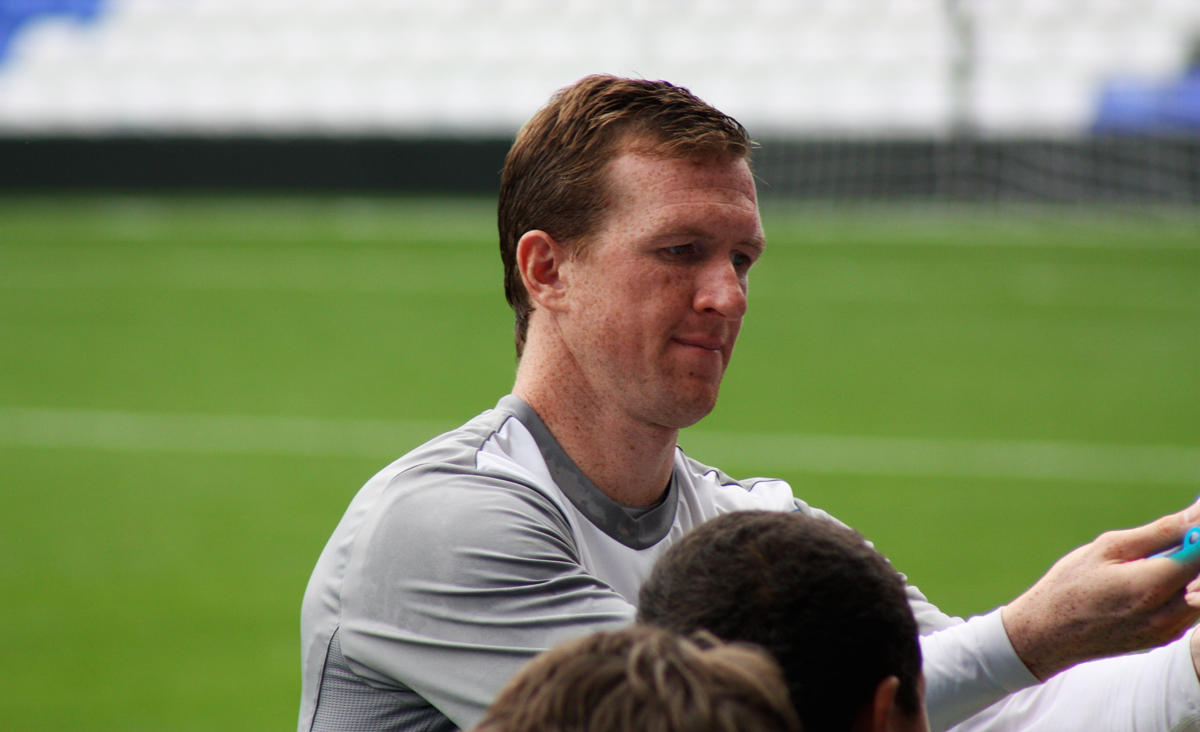
Caldwell signing autographs with the Birmingham City supporters at St Andrew's in 2011

On 7 July 2011, Caldwell signed a two-year contract with Birmingham City, newly relegated to the Championship.

He made his debut for the club on the opening day of the 2011–12 Football League Championship season, playing the whole of a 2–1 defeat at Derby County. He came close to opening the scoring in the Europa League play-off round first leg against Portuguese club Nacional, the first time that Birmingham had participated in major European competition for nearly 50 years, when his placed header struck the foot of the post. In the return, Caldwell helped the club beat Nacional 3–0 advance to the Group Stage. Since making his debut for Birmingham City, he quickly became a first team regular, forming a centre–back partnership with Curtis Davies. Caldwell then helped the club keep four consecutive clean sheets between 16 October 2011 and 29 October 2011. His performance was praised by Manager Chris Hughton for his dedication and commitment to the team. In return, he praised his philosophy, comparing it to his former manager Owen Coyle and even going far as to say "the best sort of manager to play for". Caldwell also captained Birmingham City's matches in the UEFA Europa League group stage, as they were eliminated. He successfully predicted that if the club failed to qualify for the Europa League knockout stage, it would be a disappointment. Once again, Caldwell helped the club keep four consecutive clean sheets between 14 January 2012 and 28 January 2012. In the absence of Stephen Carr and Liam Ridgewell, he captained Birmingham City for the rest of the 2011–12 season. Caldwell stated on two occasions that the club can win the promotion back to the Premier League. However in a match against Ipswich Town on 17 April 2012, he suffered a groin injury and was substituted in the 35th minute, as Birmingham City drew 1–1. After the match, it was announced that Caldwell was sidelined for the rest of the 2011–12 season. He previously missed a match against Watford on 28 August 2011. Caldwell's groin injury was considered to be a loss among the club's supporters, considering his contribution he has done this season so far. However in his absence, Birmingham City lost 3–2 against Blackpool in the semi–finals of the Championship play–offs. At the end of the 2011–12 season, Caldwell went on to make fifty–two appearances in all competitions.

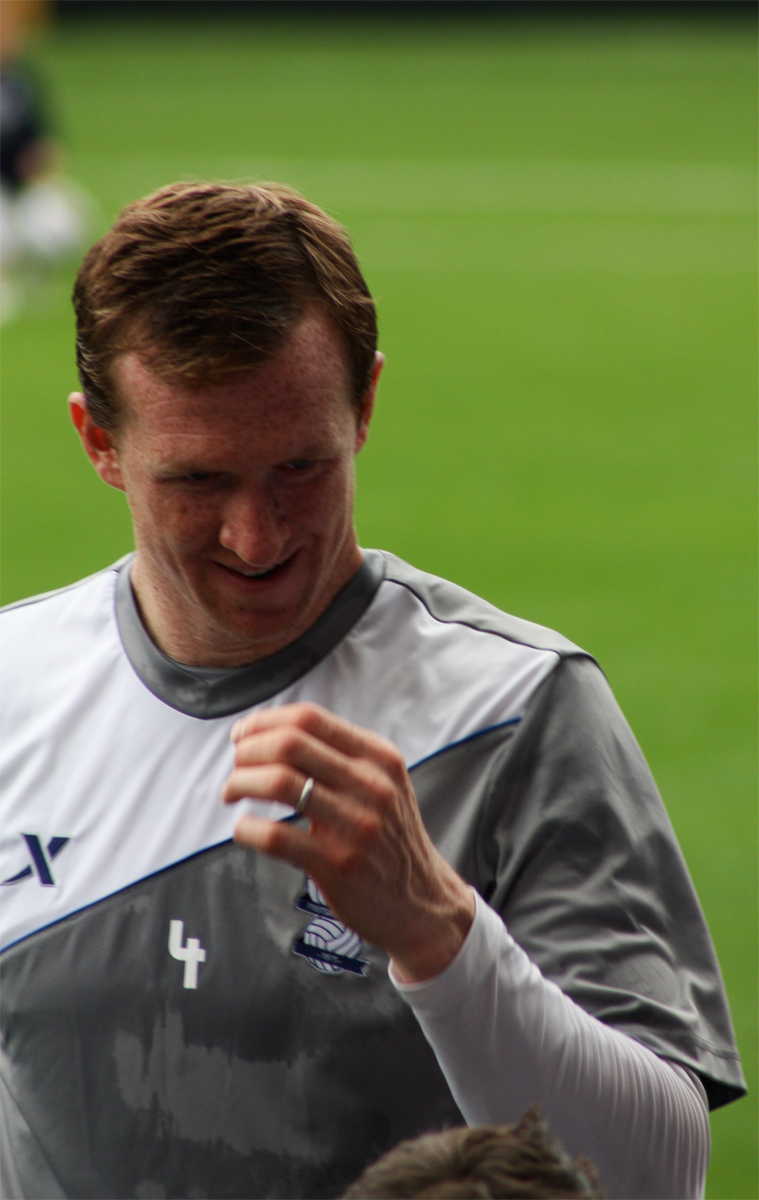
Caldwell training at St Andrew's, 2011

Ahead of the 2012–13 season, Caldwell made his return from injury for Birmingham City and featured in a first half friendly match against Borussia Mönchengladbach on 21 July 2012, as the club drew 2–2. He continued to go to the rehabilitation to recover from his groin injury, with Manager Lee Clark saying the situation is monitoring carefully. At the start of the 2012–13 season, Caldwell scored his first goal for Birmingham City on 14 August 2012 in a 5–1 win over Barnet in the League Cup. Since then, he continued to regain his first team place, forming a centre–back partnership with Davies, as well as, resuming his duties as captain. However, Caldwell was dropped to the substitute bench for the next two matches between 27 November 2012 and 30 November 2012. But he returned to the starting line–up against Wolverhampton Wanderers on 8 December 2012, as the club lost 1–0. Caldwell then started in the first team for the next fifteen matches, as well as, resuming his captain duties. On 19 January 2013 he scored his second goal of the season, in a 2–2 draw against Brighton & Hove Albion. However in a match against Hull City on 2 March 2013, Caldwell suffered an illness that saw him substituted in the 37th minute, as Birmingham City lost 5–2. However since returning from the illness, he found himself placed on the substitute bench, with Paul Robinson preferred for the rest of the 2012–13 season. Despite this, Caldwell went on to make thirty–eight appearances and scoring two times in all competitions.

=== Toronto FC ===
In May 2013, Birmingham confirmed that they would not be taking up their option to extend Caldwell's contract, and he signed for Canadian club Toronto FC of Major League Soccer on loan for the remaining few weeks of that contract.

Caldwell made his debut for the club on 18 May 2013, in the starting eleven at home to the Columbus Crew, and was "bitterly disappointed" by the 1–0 defeat. After his contract expired with Birmingham, he signed a two-and-a-half-season contract with Toronto FC, after helping improve the team's goals-against average from 1.5 to 1.0 goals a game. Caldwell scored his first goal with the club on 3 July 2013 in a 3–3 home draw to Canadian rivals, Montreal Impact. On 13 July 2013, he became Toronto FC's sixth team captain in the franchise's history after incumbent captain Darren O'Dea was transferred to another club. Since joining the club, Caldwell became a first team regular for the rest of the 2013 season. However in a match against Sporting Kansas City on 21 September 2013, he received a straight red card in the 86th minute for a foul on Josh Garner, as Toronto lost 2–1. Despite this, Caldwell went on to make twenty–three appearances and scoring once in all competitions. In December 2013, readers of "Waking the Red", a Toronto news site, voted him as the team's best player of the 2013 season. He was given a similar honour by the Red Patch Boys.

At the start of the 2014 season, Caldwell continued to be in the first team regular, playing in the centre–back position, as well as, resuming his captain duties for Toronto. He then played in 2014 Canadian Championship#Final both legs of the Canadian Championship finals against Montreal Impact, as the club lost 2–1 on aggregate. However along the way, Caldwell faced two suspensions, including being sent–off against Sporting Kansas City on 24 May 2014. By mid–July, however, he suffered a quad tear that saw him sidelined for a month. On 24 August 2014 Caldwell returned to the starting line–up against Chicago Fire, only to suffer an injury and substituted in the 22nd minute, as Toronto drew 2–2. Following the match, it was announced that he was sidelined for several weeks, having failed to recover from a quad injury. On 21 September 2014 Caldwell returned to the starting line–up against Chivas USA and helped the club keep a clean sheet, winning 3–0. Following his return, he started in the remaining six matches of the 2014 season for Toronto. At the end of the 2014 season, Caldwell went on to make twenty–four appearances in all competitions. Reflecting in the season, he tweeted his frustration but determined to help the club get back on track next season.

Ahead of the 2015 season, Caldwell was demoted from team captain following the promotion to captain of designated player and American national team mainstay Michael Bradley. He made two appearances for Toronto before suffering an achilles tendon problems during a match against Columbus Crew on 14 March 2015. As a result, Caldwell was sidelined for a month. As a result of his injury, Caldwell announced his retirement from professional football on 14 July 2015. He retired four months after his brother, Gary.

== International career ==
=== Youth Team ===
In March 2000, Caldwell was called up to the Scotland U21 squad for the first time. He made his U21 debut, starting the whole game, in a 2–0 loss against France U21 on 28 March 2000. Caldwell then played alongside Gary for the first time for Scotland U21, as the U21 side lost 1–0 against Belgium U21. He later made three more appearances for Scotland U21 later in 2001. The next two years saw him make two appearances for the U21 side, making a total of ten appearances.

In November 2002, Caldwell was called up for the Scotland B team for the first time. He then started the whole game, as the national side B team drew 3–3 against Germany B on 18 December 2002. A year later, Caldwell, once again, called up to Scotland B Team once again. He then scored his first goal for the national B Team, as they drew 3–3 against Turkey Future on 10 December 2003. After the match, Caldwell criticised Turkey, calling them a "cheat".

=== Senior career ===
In April 2001, Caldwell was called up to the senior squad for the first time after breaking into the Newcastle United's first team. He made his debut for Scotland in a 1–1 draw away in Poland at the Zdzisław Krzyszkowiak Stadium on 25 April 2001.

His home debut came on 12 February 2003 in a 2–0 defeat to the Republic of Ireland at Hampden Park. However, Caldwell did not play for the national side for rest of 2003, as Manager Berti Vogts placed him on the substitute bench and they did not qualify for the UEFA Euro 2004. On 18 February 2004 he returned to the starting line–up for Scotland, as they lost 4–0 against Wales. Three months later on 30 May 2004 against Trinidad and Tobago, Caldwell came on for his brother in the 79th minute, and played the remaining match, as the national side won 4–1.

He played twice in Scotland's qualification for the 2006 World Cup, in a 1–1 draw with Moldova at the Zimbru Stadium in Chişinău, playing alongside Gary for the first time (they were the first siblings to play together for the national team since the 1940s) and a 3–0 away win over Slovenia at the Arena Petrol in Celje. However, Caldwell expressed his frustration on being overlooked from the national team squad, though he later credited new Manager Walter Smith for reviving his Scotland's career.

Having been a year without being called up to the national team squad, Caldwell maintained that he's still open to be called up for Scotland. On 5 August 2009 Caldwell was called up to the national team squad for the first time in three years. He played alongside Gary against Norway on 12 August 2009 until his younger brother was sent–off in the 13th minute before being substituted himself in the 48th minute, as Scotland lost 4–0 in the national side's 2010 World Cup qualification. After the match, Caldwell spoke about the match, describing it as a "freak result" Eventually, he did not play for the national side for the rest of the year, as Scotland finished third, behind Norway, in their qualifying group.

On 11 November 2010 Caldwell was called up to the national team squad for over a year. He briefly captained Scotland when a substitution took place in a 3–0 win against the Faroe Islands on 16 November 2010. His twelfth and final full cap came against Northern Ireland in the 2011 Nations Cup. In total, Caldwell won twelve caps for Scotland at senior international level. Reflecting on his time at the national side, he said: "I think I was unlucky at times with Scotland. I think there was a certain snobbery about playing in Scotland at the time. Guys who played with Scottish clubs got caps that I was better than. I sit here and I'm bloody proud of those 12 caps I won. I'm especially proud and will be forever proud of the three or four I played with my brother. I can't ever really get across what that feels like, what that means for me, for him, for the two of us. It's one of my greatest achievements in football. I got two late Scotland caps when I was playing for Wigan and I'm really, really proud of those. I felt like it was the start of this era that we're in now. We had these young guys coming through – Steven Naismith, James Morrison, James McArthur. Kenny Miller was captain in that last game [against Northern Ireland in Dublin in 2011] and as he went off, he gave me the armband. It was another honour. Whatever the game, to have worn the Scottish armband, that was an incredible feeling."

== Broadcasting ==
Caldwell became an in-game and studio analyst with Canadian network TSN starting in 2016.

== Coaching and executive career ==
=== Oakville Blue Devils ===
In February 2019, Caldwell was named president of Oakville Blue Devils FC of League1 Ontario, the third division in the Canadian soccer league system.

=== Canada ===
Caldwell became an assistant coach of the Canada men's national soccer team under John Herdman in September 2019.

== Personal life ==
Growing up, Caldwell idolised Kenny Dalglish, who he played under while at Newcastle United, and Mick McCarthy, who played a role in his joining Sunderland in 2004. Caldwell also grew up supporting Celtic, which Gary ended up playing for.

Caldwell is separated and has two children, Will and Robbie, from a previous marriage. Having lived in England, Caldwell and his family immigrated to Canada after joining Toronto.

Throughout his professional career, Caldwell spoke about his relationship on his younger brother, Gary on playing together for Scotland, which happened. At one point, Steven (then at Burnley) and Gary (Wigan Athletic) almost faced each other prior to a match between Burnley and Wigan Athletic, but his injury prevented him doing so.

== Career statistics ==
As of match played 14 March 2015

Appearances and goals by club, season and competition
Club	Season	League			National cup		League cup		Other		Total	
Club	Season	Division	Apps	Goals	Apps	Goals	Apps	Goals	Apps	Goals	Apps	Goals
Newcastle United	1998–99	Premier League	0	0	0	0	0	0	0	0	0	0
Newcastle United	1999–2000	Premier League	0	0	0	0	0	0	0	0	0	0
Newcastle United	2000–01	Premier League	9	0	0	0	1	1	—		10	1
Newcastle United	2001–02	Premier League	0	0	0	0	0	0	3 (Note: Appearances in the UEFA Intertoto Cup)	0	3	0
Newcastle United	2002–03	Premier League	14	1	0	0	1	0	2 (Note: Appearances in the UEFA Champions League)	0	17	1
Newcastle United	2003–04	Premier League	5	0	0	0	1	0	1 (Note: Appearances in the UEFA Cup)	0	7	0
Newcastle United	Total		28	1	0	0	3	1	6	0	37	2
Blackpool (loan)	2001–02	Division Two	6	0	—		—		1 (Note: Appearances in the Football League Trophy)	1	7	1
Bradford City (loan)	2001–02	Division One	9	0	—		—		—		9	0
Leeds United (loan)	2003–04	Premier League	13	1	—		—		—		13	1
Sunderland	2004–05	Championship	41	4	1	0	2	1	—		44	5
Sunderland	2005–06	Premier League	24	0	0	0	2	0	—		26	0
Sunderland	2006–07	Championship	11	0	0	0	0	0	—		11	0
Sunderland	Total		76	4	1	0	4	1	—		81	5
Burnley	2006–07	Championship	17	0	—		—		—		17	0
Burnley	2007–08	Championship	29	2	1	0	2	0	—		32	2
Burnley	2008–09	Championship	45	2	4	0	5	0	3 (Note: Appearances in the Football League Championship play-offs)	0	57	2
Burnley	2009–10	Premier League	13	1	0	0	0	0	—		13	1
Burnley	Total		104	5	5	0	7	0	3	0	119	5
Wigan Athletic	2010–11	Premier League	10	0	2	0	3	0	—		15	0
Birmingham City	2011–12	Championship	43	0	3	0	0	0	6 (Note: Appearances in the UEFA Europa League)	0	52	0
Birmingham City	2012–13	Championship	34	1	2	0	2	1	—		38	2
Birmingham City	Total		77	1	5	0	2	1	6	0	90	2
Toronto (loan)	2013	Major League Soccer	6	0	—		—		—		6	0
Toronto FC	2013	Major League Soccer	17	1	—		—		—		17	1
Toronto FC	2014	Major League Soccer	21	0	3	0	—		—		24	0
Toronto FC	2015	Major League Soccer	2	0	0	0	—		—		2	0
Toronto FC	Total		46	1	3	0	—		—		49	1
Career total			369	13	16	0	19	3	16	1	420	17

== Honours ==
Sunderland

- Football League Championship: 2004–05

Burnley

- Football League Championship play-offs: 2009

Individual

- Red Patch Boys Player of the Year: 2013
