= Canadian Classique =

Soccer rivalry between Toronto FC and CF Montréal

- Other names: 401 Derby, Two Solitudes Derby
- Location: Central Canada
- Teams: CF Montréal; Toronto FC
- First meeting: May 27, 2008; Canadian Championship; Montreal Impact 0–1 Toronto FC
- Latest meeting: October 10, 2026; MLS regular season Toronto FC 2–1 CF Montréal
- Next meeting: TBD
- Stadiums: BMO Field, Toronto, Ontario; Saputo Stadium, Montreal, Quebec

Statistics
- Total meetings: 67
- Most wins: Toronto FC (31)
- Top scorer: Jozy Altidore (13)
- All-time series: Toronto FC: 31; Draw: 14; CF Montréal: 22
- Largest victory: Montreal Impact 6–0 Toronto FC; Canadian Championship (May 1, 2013)
- Longest win streak: CF Montréal (5) (July 16, 2022 – August 20, 2023)

Postseason history
- 2015 knockout round: Montreal won 3–0; 2016 conference finals: Toronto won 7–5 (agg.)
- Stadiums within Canada

The Canadian Classique, also known as the 401 Derby and the Two Solitudes Derby, is a soccer rivalry between Canadian clubs, Toronto FC and CF Montréal (formerly the Montreal Impact). The rivalry gets the "401" nickname from Ontario Highway 401, which forms most of the standard driving route between the two cities (with the remainder being Quebec Autoroute 20), as well as the Two Solitudes book and cultural phenomenon. It is a tense rivalry, stemming from other sporting rivalries between Toronto and Montreal.

== History ==
=== Early history ===
The first professional soccer clubs to be played in either Toronto or Montreal were the Toronto Metros and Montreal Olympique, who both began play in 1971. The two teams played infrequently due to consistent relocation and expansion/contraction in the old North American Soccer League. Throughout the 1980s, different teams from both respective metropolises formed and folded, rarely aligned with one another at the same season.

In 1992, the original Montreal Impact side formed by the Saputo family, following the demise of Montreal Supra and its league (the Canadian Soccer League). They became a dominant club in the American Professional Soccer League (1993–1996) and the A-League (1997–2003), renamed the USL First Division (2004). The team did not compete during the 1999 A-League season. Their main rivals were the Rochester Rhinos and the Toronto Lynx prior to the latter's move to the USL Premier Development League.

=== Pre-MLS era ===
The modern day rivalry involving Toronto FC came into fruition during the first ever Canadian Championship, Canada's domestic cup competition that was formed in 2008. The tournament is used as well to determine Canada's sole berth into the CONCACAF Champions League. It was the 2008 edition of the tournament where Montreal and Toronto played their first competitive game against one another. Played on May 27, 2008, Toronto emerged victorious 1–0 over thanks to a Marco Vélez goal in the 72nd minute in front of a crowd of 12,303 at Saputo Stadium. Toronto, being the lone MLS team in the tournament, despite being an expansion franchise, was expected to ultimately win the tournament. Ultimately, though, the Impact ended up winning the three-way tournament, against Toronto and Vancouver Whitecaps, achieving the first Canadian Championship after posting a 2–1–1 record. The title was clinched by Montreal against Toronto on Toronto's home ground, BMO Field. The 1–1 draw which gave Montreal the title on Toronto's home soil further fueled the rivalry. By winning that title, Montreal earned a berth into the 2008–09 CONCACAF Champions League where they reached the quarterfinals.

Toronto got revenge on the Montreal at the following Canadian Championship by scoring six unanswered goals in a come-from-behind 6–1 win at Saputo Stadium. Toronto captain, Dwayne De Rosario netted a hat trick in the match. The match also secured Toronto's place in the 2009–10 CONCACAF Champions League, where they were eliminated in the preliminary round of the tournament. The Reds continued their reign of dominance in the 2010 edition of the Canadian Championship, beating Montreal in both the home and away legs of the competition, tallying an aggregate score of 3–0 during that time. With the arrival of FC Edmonton, the 2011 edition of the competition did not see the Impact and Reds meet each other.

=== MLS era ===
It was around this time that it was announced that the Impact would be "promoted" to Major League Soccer at the start of the 2012. The announcement officially came from MLS commissioner, Don Garber and the Saputo family on May 7, 2010. On June 14, 2011, the Montreal Impact announced a five-year agreement with the Bank of Montreal to become their lead sponsor and jersey sponsor in MLS, the same kit sponsor of Toronto.

Montreal and Toronto played their first MLS competition on April 7, 2012. Played in front of a crowd of 24,000 at Olympic Stadium, the Impact emerged victorious, 2–1, over the Reds. Bosnian Siniša Ubiparipović netted the opening goal of the derby in MLS competitions, scoring for Montreal in the 18th minute. Andrew Wenger, the first pick of the 2012 MLS SuperDraft, netted in the 81st minute to give the Impact the game-winning goal. Dutch international Danny Koevermans netted a consolation goal for Toronto in the 88th minute.

In 2013, the Reds and Impact split the series 1–1–1. A crowd of 38,000 was on hand to watch the first match of the 2013 series, where Montreal won 2–1. Additionally, in 2013, the Impact won their first Canadian Championship since joining MLS. During their 2013 Canadian Championship run, the Impact defeated Toronto by a 6–0 scoreline, to date, the largest margin of victory in the derby history.

On April 24, 2013, Justin Braun became the first player to play for both sides of the derby, after he was traded from Montreal to Toronto over the winter break. Collen Warner repeated the feat in 2014 after being traded to Toronto for Issey Nakajima-Farran, who had never played against Montreal before the exchange. Dominic Oduro (2015) and Kyle Bekker (2016) later joined the turncoat club, both playing for Toronto before Montreal. Canadian goalkeeper Greg Sutton played for both the NASL edition of the Montreal Impact and for Toronto FC, but only ever played for the Reds in derby matches. No player has ever scored a goal for both teams in derby matches.

October 29, 2015, was the first time that the teams met in the MLS Cup Playoffs. The match at Saputo Stadium ended 3–0 in favour of the Impact. It also marked Toronto's first appearance in the playoffs in their history, and Montreal's second-ever playoff game. The two teams faced off again for the second consecutive time in the 2016 MLS Cup Playoffs in two games as both Toronto and Montreal defeated New York City FC and New York Red Bulls respectively, making the rivalry part of the Eastern Conference Finals. Montreal won the first leg of the Conference Championship, 3–2 at the Olympic Stadium in Montreal on November 22. Toronto later beat Montreal 5–2 in extra time in the return leg at BMO Field in Toronto on November 30, winning on an aggregated score of 7–5, making Toronto FC the first Canadian team to compete in an MLS Cup Final.

On February 24, 2016, both Montreal and Toronto played together for the first time outside of Canada, with the teams playing together for the Suncoast Invitational. The match played in the Joe DiMaggio Sports Complex in Clearwater, Florida ended with a 1–1 tie. Toronto played as the home team in this match.

In 2020, both Toronto and Montreal played in the MLS is Back Tournament where Toronto and Montreal both played in Group C along with New England Revolution and D.C. United. Toronto defeated Montreal 3–4 where Montreal played as the home team although both teams ended up advancing to the knockout stage. Neither teams did not meet each other after the round of 16 as both teams were defeated in the round of 16.

After the tournament, the teams returned to Canada to play additional matches with each other to compete in the qualifying round of the 2020 Canadian Championship before playing the remainder of the matches in the United States. On the first leg of the rivalry, Toronto defeated Montreal 0–1 in Montreal's home match while Montreal defeated Toronto 0–1 while competing against Toronto in the second leg. The third leg gave Toronto another win in Montreal, defeating Montreal 1–2. After three additional games with Vancouver, two of which were wins against Vancouver, Toronto were qualified for the Canadian Championship.

In 2021, COVID-19 cross-border restrictions imposed by the Canadian government forced both Toronto and Montreal to play their home matches for the 2021 MLS season in the United States since the start of the season, while also sharing stadiums with other American MLS Teams. Both teams played together at Inter Miami CF's stadium DRV PNK Stadium in Fort Lauderdale, Florida on April 17, 2021, where Montreal (playing as the home team in this match) win against Toronto 4-2 behind closed doors. On July 23, MLS announced that the upcoming rivalry match scheduled to take place August 27 along with other home matches of both teams for that month would be played in Canada.

== Supporters ==
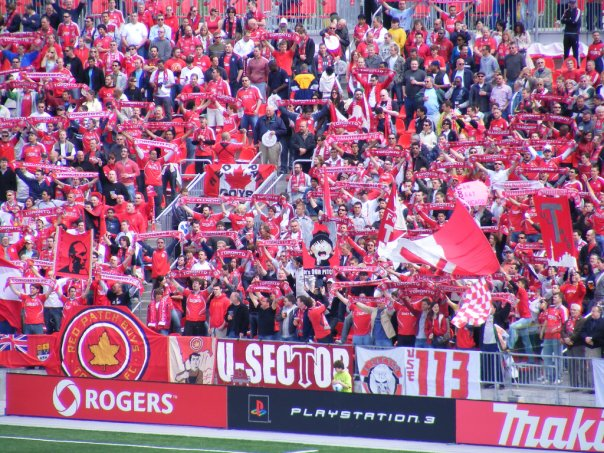
The U-Sector and Red Patch Boys supporters at a Toronto FC home fixture.

Off the field, there is intense rivalry between the supporters groups of Toronto and Montreal. Toronto's prominent supporters' groups are U-Sector and Red Patch Boys. In addition to Toronto FC; the U-Sector also support the Canada national team, and the TFC Academy teams. Additionally, the club is supported by several other supporter's groups including Original 109 who sit in Section 109 of BMO Field, SG114 who sit in Section 114, and the Tribal Rhythm Nation who represent the African, Caribbean and Latin American communities in the Greater Toronto Area.

The largest, and oldest supporters group for Montreal is Ultras Montréal, who are also known as UM02, for the year the supporters club was founded (2002). Additionally, Montreal are supported by 127 Montréal. 127 Montréal formed in 2011, around the time the Montreal Impact were in transition from NASL to MLS. In 2011, the Montreal Impact Supporters Association was created to better facilitate the relations between the Club and the Supporters Groups, to promote the supporters culture, and to help with the financing of different supporter group initiatives. Moreover, Montreal is supported by 1642 Montreal, for the year of the foundation of Montreal. 1642 Montreal is known to ring a bell of 0.8 ton to celebrate any goal scored by the team.

== Joint sponsorship ==
The Bank of Montreal, which has offices in both Toronto and Montreal, are the primary sponsors of both teams since both teams started playing in the MLS in 2007 and 2011 respectively. It also has naming rights to Toronto FC's home stadium, BMO Field.

== Stadium ==
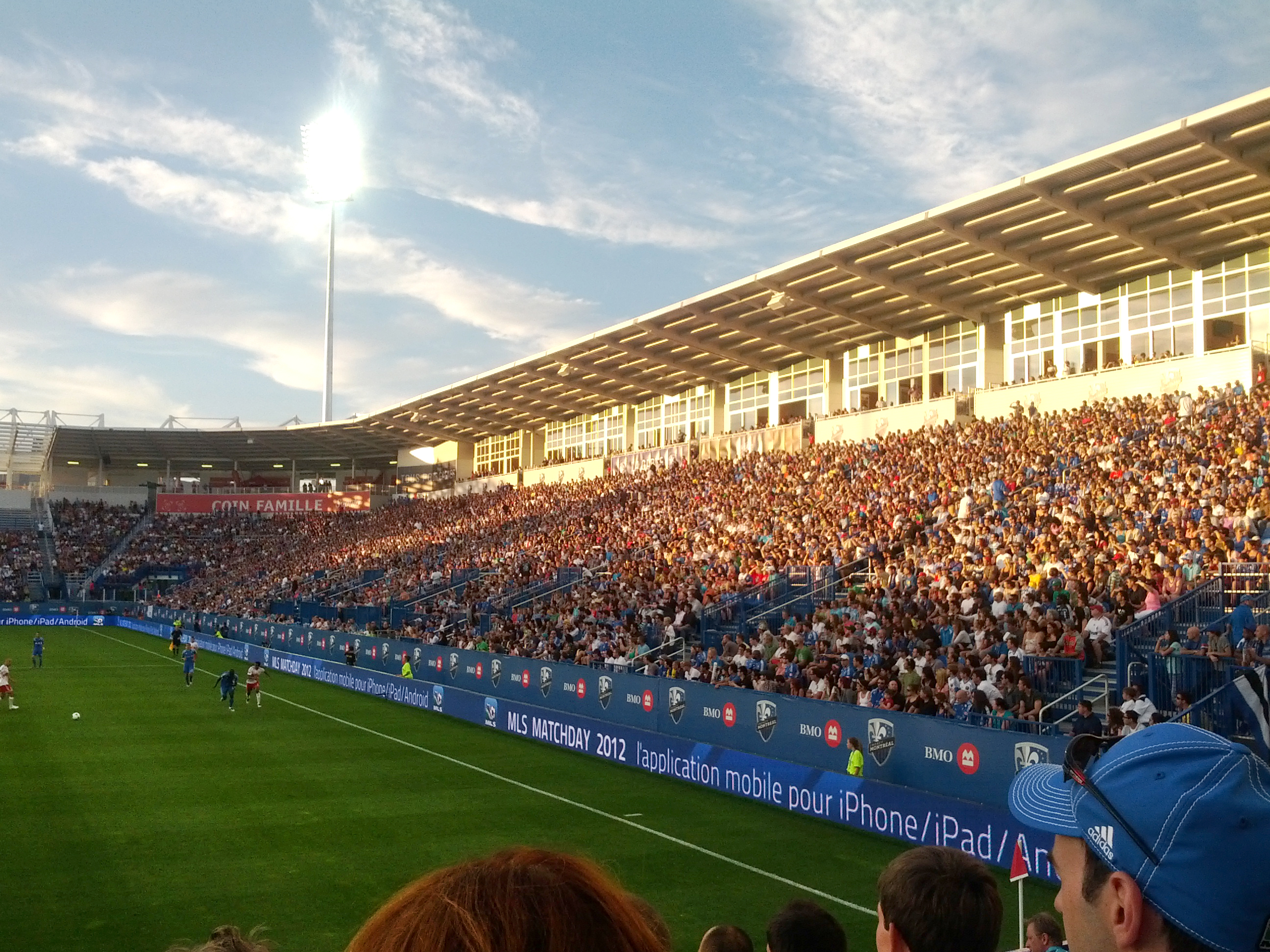
Saputo Stadium is the home ground for CF Montréal.

Both Toronto and Montreal play in soccer-specific stadiums and have been doing so for their entire existence. BMO Field is Toronto FC's home stadium, while Saputo Stadium serves as home ground for CF Montréal. For marquee matchups, such as games against acclaimed opponents, rivals, or Champions League fixtures, as well as winter-time matches, both teams sometimes play in larger, indoor stadiums in their respective region. Toronto FC have played several games at Rogers Centre while CF Montréal have played their share of games at Olympic Stadium, which is within walking distance of Saputo Stadium.

Toronto's BMO Field is located in Exhibition Place of the city, near the banks of Lake Ontario. Saputo Stadium is located along the border of Montreal's Rosemont-La Petite-Patrie district and Parc Olympique district. BMO Field currently sits 30,991 (21,566 before May 2015) while Saputo Stadium currently seats 20,521.

== Results ==
Montreal wins
Toronto wins
Draw

List of matches
Season	Competition	Date	Home team	Result	Away team	Venue	Attendance	Series	Recap
2008	Canadian Championship	May 27, 2008	Montreal	0–1	Toronto	Saputo Stadium, Montreal, Quebec	12,083	TOR 1–0–0	
2008	Canadian Championship	July 22, 2008	Toronto	1–1	Montreal	BMO Field, Toronto, Ontario	19,872	TOR 1–0–1	
2009	Canadian Championship	May 13, 2009	Toronto	1–0	Montreal	BMO Field, Toronto, Ontario	19,811	TOR 2–0–1	
2009	Canadian Championship	June 18, 2009	Montreal	1–6	Toronto	Saputo Stadium, Montreal, Quebec	11,561	TOR 3–0–1	
2010	Canadian Championship	April 28, 2010	Toronto	2–0	Montreal	BMO Field, Toronto, Ontario	21,436	TOR 4–0–1	
2010	Canadian Championship	May 12, 2010	Montreal	0–1	Toronto	Saputo Stadium, Montreal, Quebec	10,737	TOR 5–0–1	
2012	Major League Soccer	April 7, 2012	Montreal	2–1	Toronto	Olympic Stadium, Montreal, Quebec	23,120	TOR 5–1–1	
2012	Canadian Championship	May 2, 2012	Montreal	0–0	Toronto	Olympic Stadium, Montreal, Quebec	13,4050	TOR 5–1–2	
2012	Canadian Championship	May 9, 2012	Toronto	2–0	Montreal	BMO Field, Toronto, Ontario	15,016	TOR 6–1–2	
2012	Major League Soccer	June 27, 2012	Montreal	0–3	Toronto	Saputo Stadium, Montreal, Quebec	14,412	TOR 7–1–2	
2012	Major League Soccer	October 20, 2012	Toronto	0–0	Montreal	BMO Field, Toronto, Ontario	16,151	TOR 7–1–3	
2013	Major League Soccer	March 16, 2013	Montreal	2–1	Toronto	Olympic Stadium, Montreal, Quebec	37,896	TOR 7–2–3	
2013	Canadian Championship	April 24, 2013	Toronto	2–0	Montreal	BMO Field, Toronto, Ontario	11,043	TOR 8–2–3	
2013	Canadian Championship	May 1, 2013	Montreal	6–0	Toronto	Saputo Stadium, Montreal, Quebec	14,931	TOR 8–3–3	
2013	Major League Soccer	July 3, 2013	Toronto	3–3	Montreal	BMO Field, Toronto, Ontario	21,700	TOR 8–3–4	
2013	Major League Soccer	October 26, 2013	Toronto	1–0	Montreal	BMO Field, Toronto, Ontario	13,211	TOR 9–3–4	
2014	Canadian Championship	May 28, 2014	Toronto	1–1	Montreal	BMO Field, Toronto, Ontario	18,269	TOR 9–3–5	
2014	Canadian Championship	June 4, 2014	Montreal	1–0	Toronto	Saputo Stadium, Montreal, Quebec	13,423	TOR 9–4–5	
2014	Major League Soccer	August 2, 2014	Montreal	0–2	Toronto	Saputo Stadium, Montreal, Quebec	16,655	TOR 10–4–5	
2014	Major League Soccer	October 18, 2014	Toronto	1–1	Montreal	BMO Field, Toronto, Ontario	15,242	TOR 10–4–6	
2015	Canadian Championship	May 6, 2015	Montreal	1–0	Toronto	Saputo Stadium, Montreal, Quebec	12,518	TOR 10–5–6	
2015	Canadian Championship	May 13, 2015	Toronto	3–2	Montreal	BMO Field, Toronto, Ontario	21,069	TOR 11–5–6	
2015	Major League Soccer	June 24, 2015	Toronto	3–1	Montreal	BMO Field, Toronto, Ontario	24,895	TOR 12–5–6	
2015	Major League Soccer	August 29, 2015	Toronto	2–1	Montreal	BMO Field, Toronto, Ontario	30,266	TOR 13–5–6	
2015	Major League Soccer	October 25, 2015	Montreal	2–1	Toronto	Saputo Stadium, Montreal, Quebec	20,801	TOR 13–6–6	
2015	MLS Cup playoffs	October 29, 2015	Montreal	3–0	Toronto	Saputo Stadium, Montreal, Quebec	18,069	TOR 13–7–6	
2016	Suncoast Invitational	February 24, 2016	Toronto (Note: Toronto was declared the 'home team', but this match was played at Joe DiMaggio Sports Complex in Clearwater, Florida.)	1–1	Montreal	Joe DiMaggio Sports Complex, Clearwater, Florida		–	
2016	Major League Soccer	April 23, 2016	Montreal	0–2	Toronto	Saputo Stadium, Montreal, Quebec	20,801	TOR 14–7–6	
2016	Canadian Championship	June 1, 2016	Toronto	4–2	Montreal	BMO Field, Toronto, Ontario	22,143	TOR 15–7–6	
2016	Canadian Championship	June 8, 2016	Montreal	0–0	Toronto	Saputo Stadium, Montreal, Quebec	18,964	TOR 15–7–7	
2016	Major League Soccer	August 27, 2016	Toronto	0–1	Montreal	BMO Field, Toronto, Ontario	28,454	TOR 15–8–7	
2016	Major League Soccer	October 16, 2016	Montreal	2–2	Toronto	Saputo Stadium, Montreal, Quebec	20,801	TOR 15–8–8	
2016	MLS Cup playoffs	November 22, 2016	Montreal	3–2	Toronto	Olympic Stadium, Montreal, Quebec	61,004	TOR 15–9–8	
2016	MLS Cup playoffs	November 30, 2016	Toronto	5–2 (Note: Toronto FC won 5–2 after extra time (7–5 on aggregate) to advance to the MLS Cup.)	Montreal	BMO Field, Toronto, Ontario	36,000	TOR 16–9–8	
2017	Canadian Championship	June 21, 2017	Montreal	1–1	Toronto	Saputo Stadium, Montreal, Quebec	14,329	TOR 16–9–9	
2017	Canadian Championship	June 27, 2017	Toronto	2–1	Montreal	BMO Field, Toronto, Ontario	26,539	TOR 17–9–9	
2017	Major League Soccer	August 27, 2017	Montreal	1–3	Toronto	Saputo Stadium, Montreal, Quebec	20,801	TOR 18–9–9	
2017	Major League Soccer	September 20, 2017	Toronto	3–5	Montreal	BMO Field, Toronto, Ontario	28,898	TOR 18–10–9	
2017	Major League Soccer	October 15, 2017	Toronto	1–0	Montreal	BMO Field, Toronto, Ontario	27,866	TOR 19–10–9	
2018	Major League Soccer	March 17, 2018	Montreal	1–0	Toronto	Olympic Stadium, Montreal, Quebec	26,005	TOR 19–11–9	
2018	Major League Soccer	August 25, 2018	Toronto	3–1	Montreal	BMO Field, Toronto, Ontario	27,294	TOR 20–11–9	
2018	Major League Soccer	October 21, 2018	Montreal	2–0	Toronto	Saputo Stadium, Montreal, Quebec	19,684	TOR 19–12–9	
2019	Major League Soccer	July 13, 2019	Montreal	0–2	Toronto	Saputo Stadium, Montreal, Quebec	19,619	TOR 21–12–9	
2019	Major League Soccer	August 24, 2019	Toronto	2–1	Montreal	BMO Field, Toronto, Ontario	28,989	TOR 22–12–9	
2019	Canadian Championship	September 18, 2019	Montreal	1–0	Toronto	Saputo Stadium, Montreal, Quebec	10,807	TOR 22–13–9	
2019	Canadian Championship	September 25, 2019	Toronto	1–0 (Note: Montreal Impact won 3–1 on penalties (1–1 on aggregate) to win the Canadian Championship.)	Montreal	BMO Field, Toronto, Ontario	21,365	TOR 23–13–9	
2020	MLS is Back Tournament	July 16, 2020	Montreal (Note: Montreal was declared the 'home team', but this match was played at the ESPN Wide World of Sports Complex in Bay Lake, Florida.)	3–4	Toronto	ESPN Wide World of Sports Complex, Bay Lake, Florida	0	TOR 24–13–9	
2020	Major League Soccer (Note: Matches were also used as qualifiers for the 2020 Canadian Championship.)	August 28, 2020	Montreal	0–1	Toronto	Saputo Stadium, Montreal, Quebec	250	TOR 25–13–9	
2020	Major League Soccer	September 1, 2020	Toronto	0–1	Montreal	BMO Field, Toronto, Ontario	0	TOR 25–14–9	
2020	Major League Soccer	September 9, 2020	Montreal	1–2	Toronto	Saputo Stadium, Montreal, Quebec	250	TOR 26–14–9	
2021	Major League Soccer	April 17, 2021	Montreal (Note: Montreal was considered the 'home team', but this match was played at the DRV PNK Stadium in Fort Lauderdale, Florida.)	4–2	Toronto	DRV PNK Stadium, Fort Lauderdale, Florida	0	TOR 26–15–9	
2021	Major League Soccer	August 27, 2021	Montreal	3–1	Toronto	Saputo Stadium, Montreal, Quebec	?	TOR 26–16–9	
2021	Major League Soccer	October 23, 2021	Toronto	1–1	Montreal	BMO Field, Toronto, Ontario	8,095	TOR 26–16–10	
2021	Canadian Championship	November 21, 2021	Montreal	1–0	Toronto	Saputo Stadium, Montreal, Quebec	12,000	TOR 26–17–10	
2022	Canadian Championship	June 22, 2022	Toronto	4–0	Montreal	BMO Field, Toronto, Ontario	18,133	TOR 27–17–10	
2022	Major League Soccer	July 16, 2022	Montreal	1–0	Toronto	Saputo Stadium, Montreal, Quebec	19,619	TOR 27–18–10	
2022	Major League Soccer	September 4, 2022	Toronto	3–4	Montreal	BMO Field, Toronto, Ontario	28,793	TOR 27–19–10	
2023	Canadian Championship	May 9, 2023	Toronto	1–2	Montreal	BMO Field, Toronto, Ontario	17,726	TOR 27–20–10	
2023	Major League Soccer	May 13, 2023	Montreal	2–0	Toronto	Saputo Stadium, Montreal, Quebec	19,619	TOR 27–21–10	
2023	Major League Soccer	August 20, 2023	Toronto	2–3	Montreal	BMO Field, Toronto, Ontario	27,518	TOR 27–22–10	
2024	Major League Soccer	May 18, 2024	Toronto	5–1	Montreal	BMO Field, Toronto, Ontario	28,261	TOR 28–22–10	
2024	Major League Soccer	July 20, 2024	Montreal	0–1	Toronto	Saputo Stadium, Montreal, Quebec	19,619	TOR 29–22–10	
2025	Canadian Championship	April 30, 2025	Toronto	2–2 (Note: Montreal won 3–2 on penalties.)	Montreal	BMO Field, Toronto, Ontario	20,265	TOR 29–22–11	
2025	Major League Soccer	May 17, 2025	Montreal	1–6	Toronto	Saputo Stadium, Montreal, Quebec	16,008	TOR 30–22–11	
2025	Major League Soccer	August 30, 2025	Toronto	1–1	Montreal	BMO Field, Toronto, Ontario	27,076	TOR 30–22–12	
2026	Major League Soccer	July 16, 2026	Montreal	0–0	Toronto	Saputo Stadium, Montreal, Quebec	17,707	TOR 30–22–13	
2026	Major League Soccer	October 10, 2026	Toronto	2–1	Montreal	BMO Field, Toronto, Ontario	21,572	TOR 31–22–13	

== Statistics ==
For statistical purposes, this table includes the NASL edition of the Montreal Impact.

As of October 10, 2026

Competition	Matches	Wins		Draws	Goals	
Competition	Matches	MTL	TOR	Draws	MTL	TOR
Major League Soccer	38	14	17	7	50	63
MLS Cup playoffs	3	2	1	0	8	7
Canadian Championship	24	6	12	6	23	35
MLS is Back Tournament	1	0	1	0	3	4
All competitions	66	22	31	13	84	109
Friendly/other	1	0	0	1	1	1
All matches	67	22	31	14	85	110

== Records ==
Most goals in a match

- 8 goals on September 20, 2017
  Toronto 3–5 **Montreal**
- 7 goals on June 18, 2009
  Montreal 1–6 **Toronto**
- 7 goals on May 17, 2025
  Montreal 1–6 **Toronto**
- 7 goals on November 30, 2016
  **Toronto** 5–2 Montreal
- 7 goals on July 16, 2020
  Montreal 3–4 **Toronto**
- 7 goals on September 4, 2022
  Toronto 3–4 **Montreal**

Margin of victory
Montreal:

- **Montreal** 6–0 Toronto on May 1, 2013
- **Montreal** 3–0 Toronto on October 29, 2015

Toronto:

- Montreal 1–6 **Toronto** on June 18, 2009
- Montreal 1–6 **Toronto** on May 17, 2025
- **Toronto** 5–1 Montreal on May 18, 2024
- **Toronto** 4–0 Montreal on June 22, 2022

Most consecutive wins
Montreal: 5 (July 16, 2022 – August 20, 2023)

=== Top goalscorers ===
As of May 17, 2025

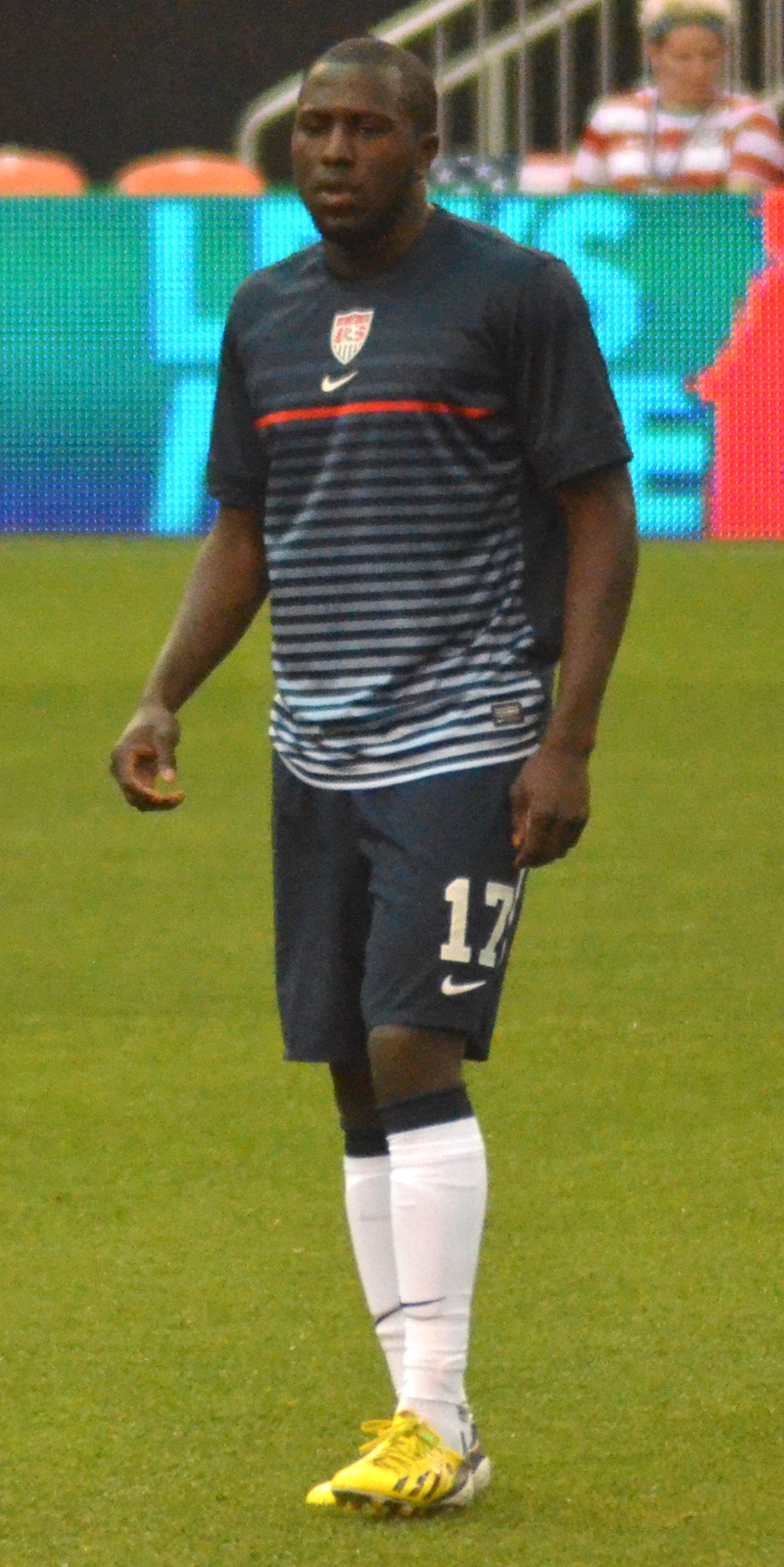
Jozy Altidore's 13 goals for Toronto FC make him the series' top goalscorer

Rank	Player	Club(s)	Nationality	Goals
1	Jozy Altidore	Toronto FC	United States	13
2	Ignacio Piatti	Montreal Impact	Argentina	11
3	Sebastian Giovinco	Toronto FC	Italy	10
4	Ayo Akinola	Toronto FC	Canada	5
4	Dominic Oduro	Montreal Impact	Ghana	5
4	Dominic Oduro	Toronto FC	Ghana	5
6	Dwayne De Rosario	Toronto FC	Canada	4
6	Marco Di Vaio	Montreal Impact	Italy	4
6	Didier Drogba	Montreal Impact	Ivory Coast	4
6	Romell Quioto	CF Montréal	Honduras	4
6	Tosaint Ricketts	Toronto FC	Canada	4

Players in bold are still active players with the team.

== Players who played for both clubs ==
=== Toronto, then Montreal ===
- (United States) Quincy Amarikwa
- (Canada) Kyle Bekker
- (Canada) Srdjan Djekanović
- (Canada) Raheem Edwards
- (Canada) Tyler Hemming
- (England) Matty Longstaff
- (United States) Daniel Lovitz
- (Canada) Jahkeele Marshall-Rutty
- (Canada) Issey Nakajima-Farran
- (Canada) Cristian Nuñez
- (Ghana) Dominic Oduro
- (Ghana) Prince Owusu
- (Canada) Luca Petrasso
- (Argentina) Maximiliano Urruti

=== Montreal, then Toronto ===
- (United States) Justin Braun
- (Canada) Adam Braz
- (Canada) Adrian Cann
- (Belgium) Laurent Ciman
- (Canada) Ali Gerba
- (United States) Djordje Mihailovic
- (Canada) Greg Sutton
- (Canada) Jules-Anthony Vilsaint
- (United States) Collen Warner

== See also ==
- Miracle in Montreal – 2009 soccer match between Montreal Impact and Toronto FC
- Pearson Cup – Former Major League Baseball rivalry between the teams in Canada
- Canadiens–Maple Leafs rivalry – National Hockey League rivalry
