= Toronto FC supporters =

This article contains information on Toronto FC's supporters groups. The club capped their 2007 season tickets sales at 14,000 on March 15, 2007, setting a league record.

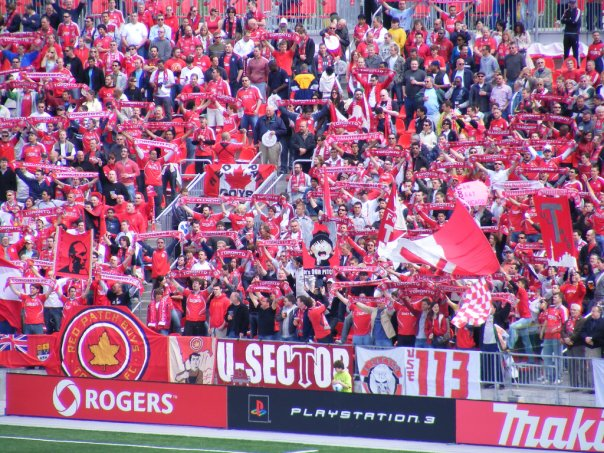
Fans celebrate at a Toronto FC match

Toronto FC currently has many supporters groups throughout the stadium. Groups recognized by the club on their official website include; Kings in the North, the Original 109, the Red Patch Boys, the Tribal Rhythm Nation, and U-Sector.

== Supporters' groups ==
=== Inebriatti ===
Originally branded as SG111, then SG114, Inebriatti was formed in 2013 with the intent of energizing the atmosphere for Toronto FC. The group spent their first season in the lower rows of section 111. In 2014 they relocated to section 114 at BMO Field. Their goal is to bring an intense style of support to the stands including the use of constant flag waving, singing, and smoke. The group requires strong member participation, and everyone actively involved in support. Members of Inebriatti believe human interaction is an important part of membership, and therefore they are not an internet based group. Their unofficial motto is "We are not a fan club." For the 2015 season, they started to use their nickname, the Inebriatti, as their proper name. On August 23, 2018, Toronto FC permanently terminated Inebriatti's supporter status for a fire they started at TD Place Stadium in Ottawa during their match-up with Toronto FC in the Canadian Championship earlier that year on July 18. However it was later overturned and they started participating again for the 2019 season. On March 10, 2023 the Inebriatti Instagram account's name was changed to "Blockcxiv". alongside a logo presenting "Block 114", The section in which the Inebriatti occupied.

=== Original 109 ===
The Original 109 was originally formed in the upper rows of section 109. A growing group of committed supporters, dedicated to supporting the club (TFC) through thick and thin, at home and at away games each year.

=== Kings In The North ===
Kings In The North is a TFC supporters group that was originally founded in 2012 at the top of section 127. They relocated to section 116 in 2014, joining the other supporter groups in the south end of the stadium.

=== Red Patch Boys ===
The Red Patch Boys is a TFC Supporters Group based in sections 111 and 112 of BMO Field which they have termed "The Bunker." The goal of the Red Patch Boys (RPBs) is to support and promote Toronto FC throughout Canada and to help contribute to the atmosphere at all TFC home games, in addition to away games including Columbus, Chicago, Los Angeles and Dallas. The group's logo is based on the Canadian Maple Leaf and its name is derived from "Red Patch Devils", a nickname for the 1st Canadian Infantry Division mobilized at the outbreak of World War II.

=== Tribal Rhythm Nation ===
The Tribal Rhythm Nation was created to bring a multi-cultural presence to Toronto FC games. The TRN represent African, Caribbean and Latin communities in the GTA. Their stated goal is to help create an energetic atmosphere at Toronto FC games through the use of drums and chanting.

=== U-Sector ===
The U-Sector sits in section 113 of BMO Field. The group was created in 2000 as a supporters group for the Toronto Lynx. Originally known as the Toronto Ultras, the U-Sector got its name because the group was always in Section 'U' at the old Varsity Stadium during Lynx matches. The group also provides travelling support for the team to nearby MLS cities such as Boston, Chicago, New York City and Columbus. It also made its presence felt at a friendly match between the U20 teams of Canada and the United States at the Rogers Centre on July 7, 2006.

== Independent website ==
=== GoTFC ===
GoTFC is a volunteer coordinated website of Toronto FC fans, not affiliated with any supporters group. On February 11, 2007, GoTFC donated a trophy to the winners of the inaugural Toronto FC Supporters' Cup tournament. Originally held indoors at a futsal centre in Don Mills, the tournament was expanded upon and moved to BMO Field in the fall of 2007. It was an annual event from 2007-2010.

== Footnotes ==
1. "Major League Soccer paves the way for an expansion team in Toronto". recorder.ca.
2. "Toronto FC sold out on season seats". mlsnet.com. Archived from the original on June 1, 2007.
3. "Toronto FC makes it two wins in a row". tsn.ca. Archived from the original on May 19, 2007.
4. "Fans & Affiliates". toronto.fc.mlsnet.com. Archived from the original on May 29, 2007.
5. "U-Sector: A History". www.embargo.ca/ultras. Archived from the original on April 30, 2007.
6. "USA Defeats Canada in U20 Friendly". ontariosoccerweb.com. Archived from the original on September 29, 2007.
7. "55th Anniversary of the Italian Campaign". Veterans Affairs Canada.
8. "2007 Supporters' Cup - Results". GoTFC. Archived from the original on October 6, 2007.
