= U-Sector =

Supporters' group

- Established: 2000
- Type: Supporters' group
- Team: Toronto FC; Toronto Lynx (formerly)
- Location: Toronto
- Website: usector.ca

U-Sector is an independent supporters' group for Major League Soccer's Toronto FC.

== History and Name ==
The U-Sector was founded in 2000 by soccer fans in the Toronto, Ontario, Canada area, as a supporters group for the Toronto Lynx. Originally known as the "Toronto Ultras," the name "U-Sector" came from the group's traditional location in Section 'U' at the old Varsity Stadium. After leaving Varsity Stadium for Centennial Park Stadium, the nickname was kept as a secondary name for the group. In the 2004 off-season, due to the widespread use of the ultras name in world football, and some of the stigma which came with it, the group adopted "U-Sector" as its official name.

Since the founding of Toronto FC in 2006, the group has expanded its primary support to the MLS side. Members are mostly located in BMO Field's section 113.

== Overview ==
U-Sector helps vocally lead the entire south stand of BMO Field through its capos, who is located on a stand placed directly in front of section 113. It is currently one of four capo stands in the stadium.

U-Sector has also contributed to the highly visual nature of TFC support, including the creation of 'Pink Streamer Day' - a different take on the widespread use of streamers at the stadium - in which pink or lavender streamers are thrown during the annual visit of the Los Angeles Galaxy to BMO Field. The group has also become known for its creative signage and banners, including one aimed at Landon Donovan, as well as a Claudio Reyna-themed "has been" sign (broadcast live on ESPN2 and The Score) that was held up behind Reyna as he took a corner kick a few feet away.

ESPN columnist Ives Galarcep highlighted the differences between the U-Sector and other TFC supporters groups in a piece in which he called U-Sector "a rowdier alternative to the Red Patch Boys and a supporter's group with ties to soccer in Toronto that extend beyond the arrival of Toronto FC." Prominent Canadian soccer journalist Ben Knight echoed those sentiments, stating "(U-Sector's) vibe is a little darker, a bit rougher, and just that thrilling edge of more chaotic."

Just as it did in the USL in previous years (especially in Rochester and Montreal), U-Sector makes its presence felt in many away venues around MLS. The group played a large part in the famous 'Columbus Invasion' of 2008 - in which an estimated 2300 TFC supporters travelled 600 kilometres to Columbus Crew Stadium - and also organized the first large-scale supporters trip in Toronto FC history, an away match against the New England Revolution on April 14, 2007.

In addition to supporting TFC and the Lynx, U-Sector members have also travelled great distances to support the Canadian national soccer team at events such as the CONCACAF Gold Cup, having a modest contingent of supporters in Foxborough in 2003 and in Chicago in 2007. As well, group members have travelled to Canadian World Cup Qualifying matches and various friendlies, with members having attended matches in Canada, the United States, Scotland, Egypt and Estonia.

While there are no 'official' affiliations with fellow TFC supporters groups Red Patch Boys the groups have co-ordinated on organizing large-scale road trips and tifo displays. On October 17, 2009, U-Sector and RPB unveiled a banner which covered BMO Field's entire south stand in tribute to retired TFC player Danny Dichio. It is believed to be the largest tifo display in MLS history to have been created and funded entirely by supporters.

Also, the U-Sector has worked in conjunction with the Voyageurs - a supporters group dedicated to the Canadian national teams - in organizing dedicated Canadian-centric support at national team games, and has taken the lead in such endeavours for Canada matches in Toronto.

== Grassroots soccer ==
To maintain a focus on the love of the game itself, the U-Sector has participated in friendly matches and tournaments throughout southern Ontario and surrounding areas.

When the Lynx were still in the First Division of the USL, the U-Sector took part in an annual game against Rochester Rhinos supporters group "The Rochester Stampede". The winner would claim the "Vallow Boot", an actual soccer shoe once belonging to Rhinos goalkeeper Scott Vallow. The U-Sector were the winners of the final Vallow Boot game in 2004.

In early 2007, U-Sector took part in the first edition of the TFC Supporters Cup, an annual tournament which features teams representing the various Toronto supporters groups (along with a TFC front office team). The U-Sector won the 2008 edition of the tourney by defeating the previous year's champion - Tribal Rhythm Nation - in the final.

Since 2007, U-Sector has run its own, full-fledged leagues with separate indoor (known as USIL - U-Sector Indoor League) and outdoor (known as USOL - U-Sector Outdoor League) seasons.

== U-Sector player of the year award ==
In 2007, the U-Sector established a Player of the Year Award, given to the TFC player who contributed the most to the team during that year. Group members vote on the Award at the end of each MLS season.

A hand-engraved glass beer mug was selected as the physical award, to be presented to the winner accompanied by that season's version of the official U-Sector scarf. Each mug is customized with the recipient's name and the year in which it was won.

Beer mugs were chosen due to their uniqueness versus standard awards such as trophies and plaques, with the idea being that the recipient would be more likely to use a mug in his everyday life, thus making the U-Sector Award more practical - and thereby more 'valuable' - than others.

On October 23, 2007, the group announced on its website that it had selected defender Jim Brennan as the inaugural recipient.

Year/season	Award recipient
2007	(Canada) Jim Brennan
2008	(Canada) Greg Sutton
2009	(Canada) Dwayne De Rosario
2010	(Switzerland) Stefan Frei
2011	(Ecuador) Joao Plata

== Footnotes ==
1. "BMO Field: An experience to remember". soccerbyives.net. Archived from the original on May 5, 2008.
2. "Video: It's Not Easy Being Claudio in Toronto". theoffsiderules.blogspot.com.
3. "Toronto fan passion unsurpassed in MLS". ESPN. Archived from the original on May 5, 2008.
4. "A dive takes a dive". Onward!.
5. "We Don't Pay For Healthcare". theglobeandmail.com. Toronto. March 30, 2008.
6. "Great Canadian Soccer Road Trips: Take Me To Boston". insidesoccer.net.
7. "The banner". Onward!.
8. "Supporters Thank Dichio". torontofc.neulion.com. Archived from the original on February 17, 2012.
9. "U-Sector wins 2008 Supporters Cup". torontofc.neulion.com. Archived from the original on July 14, 2011.
10. "9 Teams On The Court, 1 Team In The Pub..." usectorsoccer.com.
11. "Pub Crawl #4". torontofc.neulion.com. Archived from the original on July 14, 2011.
12. "Super Stefan Frei". usector.ca.
