= Red Patch Boys =

- Founded: 2006
- Type: Supporters' group
- Team: Toronto FC
- Location: BMO Field
- Website: www.redpatchboys.ca

The Red Patch Boys is an officially recognized supporters group for Major League Soccer's Toronto FC. The group was founded in late 2006 by soccer fans in the Toronto area immediately after the announcement of Toronto FC's creation as Canada's first MLS franchise. An official identity, dedicated website and message board, and formal organization of the group later emerged, and the group has grown to become the largest supporters group for Toronto FC.

At Toronto FC home matches, the group is primarily based in sections 111 and 112 of BMO Field which has been named "The Bunker", though RPB members can be found scattered all throughout the stadium. The mandate of the Red Patch Boys (RPBs) is to support and promote Toronto FC and the sport of soccer throughout Canada, and to help contribute to the atmosphere at all TFC home games. Along with the other supporter groups in Toronto, they have gained widespread notoriety for showering opposing players with streamers during corner kicks and goal celebrations. In addition to activities in their home stadium, several members also take part in away games at other MLS venues; notably Columbus, Chicago, and Foxborough. The group's name is a homage to the Red Patch Devils, a nickname given by Axis forces for the 1st Canadian Infantry Division which fought across Europe during the Second World War. The visual identity is based on the unit's badge which features a stylized Canadian Maple Leaf.

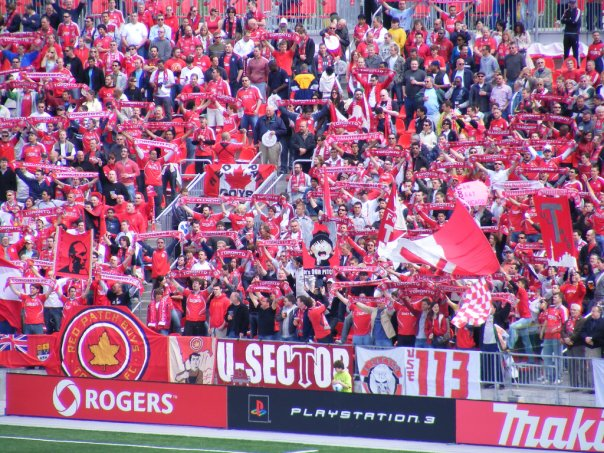
Fans celebrate at a Toronto FC match

The group runs several soccer-related events and programs throughout the year and promotes away-game viewing parties, travels to Toronto FC away matches, and takes part in various flag-making and chant-creating sessions with other Toronto FC Supporters. They are also involved in several charitable events and sponsor amateur youth soccer teams. The group's message board has been noted as a very important communication tool for all Toronto FC fans. The group maintains national and international links as well, and boasts several members from across Canada and around the world.

== Player of the year award ==
The player of the year award is presented annually by the Red Patch Boys Supporter Group to the Toronto FC player who best exemplifies outstanding on-field performance, leadership and community service.

Year	Award recipient
2007	(Canada) Jim Brennan
2008	(Wales) Carl Robinson
2009	(Canada) Dwayne De Rosario
2010	(Switzerland) Stefan Frei
2011	(Ecuador) Joao Plata
2012	(England) Richard Eckersley
2013	(Scotland) Steven Caldwell
2014	(United States) Michael Bradley
2015	(Italy) Sebastian Giovinco
2016	(Italy) Sebastian Giovinco
2017	(Spain) Víctor Vázquez
2018	(Canada) Jonathan Osorio
2019	(Spain) Alejandro Pozuelo
2020	(Spain) Alejandro Pozuelo
2021	(Canada) Richie Laryea
2022	(Italy) Federico Bernardeschi
2023	(Canada) Jonathan Osorio
2024	(Italy) Federico Bernardeschi
2025	(United States) Sean Johnson
