= 2018 Toronto FC II season =

Toronto FC II
2018 season
- General manager: Tim Bezbatchenko
- Head coach: Laurent Guyot
- United Soccer League: 4–6–24; Conference: 16th Overall: 33rd
- Top goalscorer: Jordan Hamilton; Tsubasa Endoh (8)
Home colours	Away colours

The 2018 Toronto FC II season was the fourth season in the club's history. The team finished 16th in the Eastern Conference, missing the playoffs. After the season, Toronto FC II voluntarily moved from the second division United Soccer League to the third division USL League One.

== Roster ==
=== Players ===
As of June 7, 2018.
The squad of Toronto FC II will be composed of an unrestricted number of first-team players on loan to the reserve team, players signed to TFC II, and TFC Academy players. Academy players who appear in matches with TFC II will retain their college eligibility.

Contracted players
No.	Position	Nation	Player
30	GK	ESP	Borja Angoitia
35	DF	USA	Lars Eckenrode
36	DF	GER	Tim Kübel
37	MF	GHA	Gideon Waja
38	DF	USA	Kyle Bjornethun
39	MF	CAN	Luca Petrasso
40	GK	USA	Drew Shepherd
43	FW	TTO	Aikim Andrews
45	MF	CAN	Luca Uccello
48	MF	CAN	Dante Campbell
49	DF	CAN	Robert Boskovic
50	MF	CAN	Matthew Srbely
51	MF	CAN	Malyk Hamilton
56	FW	CAN	Malik Johnson
59	MF	CAN	Noble Okello
61	DF	CAN	Rocco Romeo
64	FW	CAN	Shaan Hundal
72	DF	TTO	Jelani Peters
77	DF	SUI	Brandon Onkony
80	GK	CAN	Angelo Cavalluzzo

First team players who have been loaned to TFC II
No.	Position	Nation	Player
19	FW	USA	Ben Spencer
20	MF	USA	Ayo Akinola
22	FW	CAN	Jordan Hamilton
27	MF	CAN	Liam Fraser
28	GK	AUS	Caleb Patterson-Sewell
52	DF	CAN	Julian Dunn
54	MF	CAN	Ryan Telfer
55	MF	CAN	Aidan Daniels
88	MF	ARG	Mariano Miño

TFC Academy call-ups
No.	Position	Nation	Player
32	MF	CAN	Olakunle Dada-Luke
42	MF	CAN	Steffen Yeates
58	MF	CAN	Jordan Faria
67	FW	CAN	Daniel Da Silva
70	GK	CAN	Gianluca Catalano

== Transfers ==
=== In ===
No.	Pos.	Player	Transferred from	Fee/notes	Date	Source
37	MF	(Ghana) Gideon Waja	(Ghana) West African Football Academy		February 20, 2018	
36	DF	(Germany) Tim Kübel	(United States) Louisville Cardinals	Selected by Toronto FC in the 2nd Round of the 2018 MLS SuperDraft	March 6, 2018	
51	MF	(Canada) Malyk Hamilton	(England) West Ham United		March 6, 2018	
40	GK	(United States) Drew Shepherd	(United States) Western Michigan Broncos	Selected by Toronto FC in the 2nd Round of the 2018 MLS SuperDraft	March 15, 2018	
49	DF	(Canada) Robert Boskovic	(Canada) TFC Academy		March 15, 2018	
38	DF	(United States) Kyle Bjornethun	(United States) Portland Timbers 2		March 15, 2018	
	MF	(Argentina) Mariano Miño	(Uruguay) Sud América		March 15, 2018	
39	MF	(Canada) Luca Petrasso	(Canada) TFC Academy	Academy Signing	March 21, 2017	
39	GK	(Spain) Borja Angoitia	(United States) Rio Grande Valley FC Toros	Free Transfer	June 7, 2018	

=== Out ===
No.	Pos.	Player	Transferred to	Fee/notes	Date	Source
77	DF	(Switzerland) Brandon Onkony		Option Declined	December 4, 2017	
42	DF	(United States) Mitchell Taintor	(United States) Sacramento Republic	Released	December 4, 2017	
58	DF	(Canada) Anthony Osorio		Released	December 4, 2017	
46	DF	(United States) Jordan McCrary	(United States) Seattle Sounders FC	Released	December 4, 2017	
36	MF	(United States) Brian James		Released	December 4, 2017	
51	FW	(Trinidad and Tobago) Ricardo John	(El Salvador) L.A. Firpo	Released	December 4, 2017	
63	MF	(Canada) Liam Fraser	(Canada) Toronto FC	Promoted to First Team	January 19, 2018	
52	DF	(Canada) Julian Dunn	(Canada) Toronto FC	Promoted to First Team	April 13, 2018	
54	MF	(Canada) Ryan Telfer	(Canada) Toronto FC	Promoted to First Team	April 13, 2018	
55	MF	(Canada) Aidan Daniels	(Canada) Toronto FC	Promoted to First Team	April 13, 2018	
88	MF	(Argentina) Mariano Miño	(Canada) Toronto FC	Promoted to First Team	April 20, 2018	

=== Loan Out ===
No.	Pos.	Player	Loaned to	Fee/notes	Date	Source
61	MF	(The Gambia) Bubacarr Jobe	(Sweden) Skövde AIK	2nd year of 2-year loan	March 7, 2017	

== Competitions ==
=== Preseason ===
February 17	Toronto FC II	1–1	Syracuse Orange	Toronto, Ontario
	White	Report	Goal	Stadium: BMO Training Grounds

March 4	Toronto FC II	0–1	Ottawa Fury	Toronto, Ontario
			Haworth 75'	Stadium: BMO Training Grounds

=== United Soccer League ===
==== League table ====
===== Eastern Conference =====
Pos	Team	Pld	W	D	L	GF	GA	GD	Pts
12	Tampa Bay Rowdies	34	11	8	15	44	44	0	41
13	Penn FC	34	9	10	15	38	47	−9	37
14	Atlanta United 2	34	7	10	17	37	72	−35	31
15	Richmond Kickers	34	6	4	24	30	80	−50	22
16	Toronto FC II	34	4	6	24	42	77	−35	18

Source: 2018 USL standings
Rules for classification: 1) total wins; 2) total goal differential; 3) total goals scored; 4) points earned against top four Conference finishers; 5) disciplinary points; 6) coin toss or drawing of lots

==== Results summary ====
Overall								Home						Away					
Pld	W	D	L	GF	GA	GD	Pts	W	D	L	GF	GA	GD	W	D	L	GF	GA	GD
14	0	2	12	13	33	−20	2	0	2	3	3	8	−5	0	0	9	10	25	−15

Last updated: June 18, 2018.
Source: USL

==== Results by round ====
Round	1	2	3	4	5	6	7	8	9	10	11	12	13	14	15	16	17	18	19	20	21	22	23	24	25	26	27	28	29	30	31	32	33	34	35
Ground	A	A	H	H	H	A	H	H	H	A	A	H	A	A	H	H	H	A	A	A	H	A	H	H	A	H	H	A	A	A	A	A	H	A	A
Result	L	L	P	L	D	L	D	L	L	L	L	L	L	L	L	D	L	L	P	L	W	L	W	L	L	W	L	L	D	L					

Updated to match(es) played on August 6, 2018. Source: Regular season matches
A = Away; H = Home; W = Win; D = Draw; L = Loss; P = Postponed

==== Matches ====
Win Draw Loss Postponed

March 17	New York Red Bulls II	2–1	Toronto FC II	Harrison, New Jersey
1:00PM	Echevarria (yellow card) 28'; Redding (yellow card) 50'; Tinari 62', 72'	Report	Bjornethun (yellow card) 7'; Srbely 11', (yellow card) 58'; Andrews (yellow card) 76'; Fraser (yellow card) 90+3'	Stadium: Red Bull Arena; Referee: Kevin Broadley

March 24	Charlotte Independence	2–0	Toronto FC II	Matthews, North Carolina
7:00PM	Herrera 18'; Calvert 42'; Johnson (yellow card) 70'	Report	Spencer (yellow card) 22'	Stadium: Sportsplex at Matthews; Attendance: 1,026; Referee: Javier Santos

March 31	Toronto FC II	v	Ottawa Fury FC	Toronto, Ontario
7:30PM		Postponed		Stadium: BMO Field

April 7	Pittsburgh Riverhounds SC	4–0	Toronto FC II	Pittsburgh, Pennsylvania
2:00PM	Brett 52', 59', 83'; Dabo (yellow card) 81'; Vancaeyezeele (yellow card) 86'; François 88'	Report	Andrews (yellow card) 47'	Stadium: Highmark Stadium; Attendance: 840; Referee: Austin Saini
Note: Originally scheduled to be played at BMO Field in Toronto.

April 18	Toronto FC II	0–0	North Carolina FC	Toronto, Ontario
8:00PM	Bjornethun (yellow card) 5'	Report	Kandziora (yellow card) 78'	Stadium: BMO Field; Attendance: 50; Referee: Yusri Rudolf

April 25	Richmond Kickers	2–1	Toronto FC II	Richmond, Virginia
19:00 EDT	Imura 11'; Onkony 55' (o.g.); Osei-Wusu (yellow card) 78'; Gentile (yellow card) 81'	Report	Daniels 9'	Stadium: City Stadium; Attendance: 2,623; Referee: Marcos de Oliveira

April 28	Toronto FC II	0–0	New York Red Bulls II	Toronto, Ontario
6:30PM	(yellow card) 20' Waja; (yellow card) 60' Spencer; (yellow card) 72' Miño	Report		Stadium: BMO Field; Attendance: 117; Referee: Silviu Petrescu

May 5	Toronto FC II	1–2	Pittsburgh Riverhounds SC	Rochester, New York
6:00 PM EDT	Hundal 90+1'	Report	Brett 12'; Kerr 36'	Stadium: Marina Auto Stadium; Attendance: 1,074; Referee: Elvis Osmanovic

May 9	Toronto FC II	0–1	Penn FC	Toronto, Ontario
11:00AM		Report	Miguel Jaime 87'	Stadium: Monarch Park Stadium; Attendance: 4100

May 16	Atlanta United 2	5–4	Toronto FC II	Lawrenceville, Georgia
7:00 PM	Ambrose 5', 40'; Williams 27' (yellow card) 76'; Shannon (yellow card) 31'; Gallagher 50'; Vazquez 80'	Report	Akinola 17'; Uccello (yellow card) 32' (goal) 48', 61'; Boskovic (yellow card) 39'; Daniels 44' (pen.); Onkony (yellow card) 56'; Dunn-Johnson (yellow card) 87'; Kübel (yellow card) 90+6'	Stadium: Coolray Field; Attendance: 2,061; Referee: Jon Freemon

May 19	Charlotte Independence	2–1	Toronto FC II	Matthews, North Carolina
7:30 EDT	Herrera 28' (pen.); Zayed 49'	Report	Catalano (yellow card) 11'; Bjornethun (yellow card) 35'; Faria 66'; Onkony (yellow card) 87'	Stadium: Sportsplex at Matthews; Attendance: 987; Referee: Gustavo Solorio
Note: Originally scheduled to be played at BMO Field in Toronto, Ontario.

May 26	Toronto FC II	2–4	Tampa Bay Rowdies	Toronto, Ontario
14:00 EDT (UTC−4)	Uccello (yellow card) 21'; Bjornethun (yellow card) 26'; Campbell 50' (Petrasso); Johnson 63' (Uccello); Romeo (yellow card) 73'	Report	Nanchoff (yellow card) 18', (goal) 25'; Flemmings 24' (Schäfer), 89'; Cole (yellow card) 40'; Gorskie 74' (Schäfer), (yellow card) 77'	Stadium: BMO Field; Attendance: 141; Referee: Alain Ruch

May 30	Ottawa Fury	3–0	Toronto FC II	Ottawa, Ontario
19:00 EST (UTC–5)	Dos Santos 16' (pen.), 79'; Attakora 48'	Report	Romeo (yellow card) 59'; Boskovic (yellow card) 80'	Stadium: TD Place Stadium; Attendance: 3,219; Referee: David Barrie

June 9	Penn FC	3–2	Toronto FC II	Harrisburg, Pennsylvania
7:00PM	Metzger (yellow card) 3'; Tribbett 53', 55'; Menjivar (yellow card) 61'; Ortiz 90+7' (pen.)	Report	Akinola 13', (yellow card) 51'; Hamilton (yellow card) 40', (goal) 68'; Onkony (yellow card) 90+1'; Catalano (yellow card) 90+4'	Stadium: FNB Field; Attendance: 4,507; Referee: Thomas Snyder

June 16	Toronto FC II	1–3	Indy Eleven	Rochester, New York
7:00 PM EDT	Akinola 28'; Boskovic (yellow card) 73'; Miño (yellow card) 76'	Report	Venegas 23'; Braun 45', 49'	Stadium: Marina Auto Stadium; Attendance: 1,242; Referee: Sergii Demianchuk

June 27	Toronto FC II	3–3	FC Cincinnati	Toronto, Ontario
7:00 EDT	Akinola 28'; Bjornethun (yellow card) 45'; Boskovic 70'; Hamilton 75'; Campbell (yellow card) 88'	Report	Albadawi 8'; Welshman 38'; Ledesma 40'	Stadium: Lamport Stadium; Attendance: 288; Referee: Fabrizio Stasolla

July 1	Toronto FC II	0–4	Charleston Battery	Toronto, Ontario
8:00PM	Campbel (yellow card) 82'	Report	Rittmeyer (yellow card) 54'; Guerra 59'; Higashi 65'; Woodbine 82'; Thomas (yellow card) 84'; Wild 90+1'	Stadium: BMO Field; Attendance: 422; Referee: Carol Anne Chenard

July 4	Tampa Bay Rowdies	3–1	Toronto FC II	St. Petersburg, Florida
6:00PM	Hristov 8'; Taylor (yellow card) 27'; Taylor 54'; Cole 79'	Report	Romeo (yellow card) 30'; Dunn-Johnson (yellow card) 47'; Fitzgerald 58' (o.g.)	Stadium: Al Lang Stadium; Attendance: 5,221; Referee: Elvis Osmanovic

July 18	Louisville City FC	v	Toronto FC II	Louisville, Kentucky
7:00PM				Stadium: Louisville Slugger Field

July 21	North Carolina FC	3–1	Toronto FC II	Cary, North Carolina
7:00PM	da Luz 28'; Harrington (yellow card) 54'; Ríos 55' (pen.); Bekker 61' (yellow card) 74'; Guillen (yellow card) 70'	Report	Hundal 20'; Romeo (yellow card) 54'; Campbell (yellow card) 60'	Stadium: WakeMed Soccer Park; Attendance: 4,626; Referee: Gustavo Solorio

July 28	Toronto FC II	2–0	Nashville SC	Rochester, New York
6:00PM	Uccello 34' (pen.), (yellow card) 68'; Eckenrode (yellow card) 41'; Srbely 47'; Campbell (yellow card) 51'	Report	Doyle (yellow card) 38'; Kimura (yellow card) 45+1'	Stadium: Capelli Sport Stadium; Attendance: 2,277; Referee: Ernie Constantine

August 4	Pittsburgh Riverhounds	3–0	Toronto FC II	Pittsburgh, Pennsylvania
7:00PM	Brett 5', 69'; Zemanski (yellow card) 42'; Lubahn (yellow card) 49'; Pratzner (yellow card) 58'; Fitzpatrick 81'	Report	Bolduc (yellow card) 62'; Williams (yellow card) 84'	Stadium: Highmark Stadium; Attendance: 2,138; Referee: Charles Murphy

August 12	Toronto FC II	1–0	Richmond Kickers	Toronto, Ontario
7:30PM	Bjornethun (yellow card) 2'; Hamilton 48'; Srbely (yellow card) 85'	Report	Gonzalez (yellow card) 39'; Roberts (yellow card) 60'	Stadium: BMO Field; Attendance: 696; Referee: David Barrie

August 16	Toronto FC II	0–2	Bethlehem Steel FC	Rochester, New York
7:00PM	Hundal (yellow card) 39'; Waja (yellow card) 62'; Srbely (yellow card) 66'	Report	Nanco (yellow card) 18'; Ngalina 71'; Apodaca 83'	Stadium: Capelli Sport Stadium; Referee: Matthew Franz

August 22	Indy Eleven	3–2	Toronto FC II	Indianapolis, Indiana
7:00PM	Speas 18'; McInerney 24'; Mares 58'; Watson (yellow card) 88'	Report	Endoh 29'; Hamilton 34'	Stadium: Lucas Oil Stadium; Attendance: 8,209; Referee: Thomas Snyder

August 28	Louisville City FC	1–4	Toronto FC II	Louisville, Kentucky
7:00PM	Sands (yellow card) 15'; Ilić 37', (yellow card) 53'; DelPiccolo (yellow card) 78'	Report	Endoh 28', 64'; Mohammed (yellow card) 33'; Eckenrode (yellow card) 47'; Kübel (yellow card) 54'; Johnson 70'; Campbell 90+3'	Stadium: Louisville Slugger Field; Attendance: 6,248; Referee: Lukasz Szpala

August 31	Toronto FC II	1–2	Atlanta United 2	Toronto, Ontario
8:00PM	Mohammed (yellow card) 45+4'; Okello (yellow card) 45+5'; Srbely 90+3'	Report	Kunga 12', 52'; Ruthven (red card)	Stadium: Lamport Stadium; Attendance: 196; Referee: Pierre-Luc Lauziere

September 6	Toronto FC II	3–4	Ottawa Fury FC	Toronto, Ontario
8:00PM	Hernandez (yellow card) 39'; Endoh 47'; Bakero 47'; Srbely (yellow card) 56'; Hamilton (pen.), 74'; Hagglund (yellow card) 83'	Report	Taylor 4'; Portilla 37'; Meilleur-Giguère 69'; Reid 78'; Monsalve (yellow card) 90+4'	Stadium: Lamport Stadium; Attendance: 207; Referee: David Barrie

September 13	New York Red Bulls II	3–3	Toronto FC II	Montclair, New Jersey
7:00PM	Abang 12'; Ivan 39'; White (yellow card) 57', (goal) 68'	Report	Endoh 23'; Kübel 36'; Hamilton 62'; Boskovic (yellow card) 79'	Stadium: MSU Soccer Park at Pittser Field; Referee: Jonathan Bilinski

September 16	FC Cincinnati	4–3	Toronto FC II	Cincinnati, Ohio
4:30PM	Lasso 31'; Adi 45+2'; Bone 78', 88'	Report	Endoh 24', 45+4', 73'; Johnson (yellow card) 29'; Hundal (yellow card) 63'	Stadium: Nippert Stadium; Attendance: 27,275; Referee: Lorant Varga

September 22	Bethlehem Steel FC	4–0	Toronto FC II	Bethlehem, Pennsylvania
3:00PM	Moumbagna 2'; Ngalina 48'; Aubrey (yellow card) 52'; Chambers 57' (pen.); Nanco 75'	Report	Mohammed (yellow card) 36'	Stadium: Goodman Stadium; Attendance: 2,512; Referee: Bardhyl Pashaj

September 26	Toronto FC II	0–1	Ottawa Fury FC	Toronto, Ontario
5:00 PM	Campbell (yellow card) 16'; Mohammed (yellow card) 55'	Report	Mannella (yellow card) 16'; Taylor (yellow card) 19'; Reid (yellow card) 31'; Dos Santos 32' (pen.); Sanon (yellow card) 90+3'	Stadium: Lamport Stadium; Attendance: 107; Referee: Yusri Rudolf

September 29	Charleston Battery	1–2	Toronto FC II	Charleston, South Carolina
7:00PM	Woodbine (yellow card) 37'; Okonkwo 52'	Report	Akinola 55'; Campbell (yellow card) 59'; Hamilton 65'; Mohammed (yellow card) 81'	Stadium: MUSC Health Stadium; Attendance: 3,612; Referee: Danielle Chesky

October 5	Toronto FC II	1–3	Louisville City FC	Toronto, Ontario
8:00PM	Akinola (yellow card) 38'; Okello (yellow card) 67'; Perruzza 88'	Report	Ilić 11'; DelPiccolo (yellow card) 34'; Souahy 40'; Lancaster 81'	Stadium: Lamport Stadium; Referee: Pierre-Luc Lauziere

October 9	Nashville SC	2–2	Toronto FC II	Nashville, Tennessee
8:30PM	LaGrassa 63'; Allen 72'; Davis (yellow card) 90+5'	Report	Srbely (yellow card) 34'; Perruzza 75'; Hamilton 85'; Patterson-Sewell (yellow card) 90+1'	Stadium: First Tennessee Park; Attendance: 7,531; Referee: Kevin Broadley

October 13	Penn FC	0–0	Toronto FC II	Harrisburg, Pennsylvania
7:00PM	Calvano (yellow card) 37'; De Sousa (yellow card) 41'	Report	Perruzza (yellow card) 37'; Akinola (yellow card) 47'	Stadium: FNB Field; Attendance: 2,909; Referee: Nickrod Fateh

== Statistics ==
=== Squad and statistics ===
As of June 18, 2018

No.	Pos	Nat	Player	Total		United Soccer League	
No.	Pos	Nat	Player	Apps	Goals	Apps	Goals
19	FW	(United States) USA	Ben Spencer	3	0	3+0	0
20	FW	(United States) USA	Ayo Akinola	8	3	4+4	3
22	FW	(Canada) CAN	Jordan Hamilton	2	1	2+0	1
27	MF	(Canada) CAN	Liam Fraser	2	0	2+0	0
28	GK	(Australia) AUS	Caleb Patterson-Sewell	4	0	4+0	0
32	MF	(Canada) CAN	Olakunle Dada-Luke	4	0	1+3	0
35	DF	(United States) USA	Lars Eckenrode	1	0	1+0	0
36	DF	(Germany) GER	Tim Kübel	4	0	4+0	0
37	MF	(Ghana) GHA	Gideon Waja	9	0	8+1	0
38	DF	(United States) USA	Kyle Bjornethun	10	0	10+0	0
39	MF	(Canada) CAN	Luca Petrasso	7	0	4+3	0
40	GK	(United States) USA	Drew Shepherd	1	0	1+0	0
42	MF	(Canada) CAN	Steffen Yeates	2	0	1+1	0
43	FW	(Trinidad and Tobago) TTO	Aikim Andrews	6	0	1+5	0
45	MF	(Canada) CAN	Luca Uccello	13	2	10+3	2
48	MF	(Canada) CAN	Dante Campbell	6	1	5+1	1
49	DF	(Canada) CAN	Robert Boskovic	13	0	13+0	0
50	MF	(Canada) CAN	Matthew Srbely	10	1	7+3	1
51	MF	(Canada) CAN	Malyk Hamilton	1	0	0+1	0
52	DF	(Canada) CAN	Julian Dunn	6	0	6+0	0
54	MF	(Canada) CAN	Ryan Telfer	3	0	2+1	0
55	MF	(Canada) CAN	Aidan Daniels	11	2	10+1	2
56	FW	(Canada) CAN	Malik Johnson	14	1	9+5	1
58	MF	(Canada) CAN	Jordan Faria	6	1	2+4	1
59	MF	(Canada) CAN	Noble Okello	7	0	6+1	0
61	DF	(Canada) CAN	Rocco Romeo	9	0	9+0	0
64	FW	(Canada) CAN	Shaan Hundal	8	1	4+4	1
67	FW	(Canada) CAN	Daniel Da Silva	1	0	1+0	0
70	GK	(Canada) CAN	Gianluca Catalano	5	0	4+1	0
72	DF	(Trinidad and Tobago) TTO	Jelani Peters	0	0	0+0	0
77	DF	(Switzerland) SUI	Brandon Onkony	9	0	9+0	0
80	GK	(Canada) CAN	Angelo Cavalluzzo	5	0	5+0	0
88	MF	(Argentina) ARG	Mariano Miño	5	0	5+0	0

=== Top scorers ===
Rank	Nat.	Player	Pos.	United Soccer League	TOTAL
3	(Canada)	Matthew Srbely	FW	1	1
3	(Canada)	Jordan Hamilton	FW	1	1
2	(Canada)	Aidan Daniels	MF	2	2
3	(Canada)	Shaan Hundal	FW	1	1
2	(Canada)	Luca Uccello	MF	2	2
1	(United States)	Ayo Akinola	FW	3	3
3	(Canada)	Jordan Faria	MF	1	1
3	(Canada)	Dante Campbell	MF	1	1
3	(Canada)	Malik Johnson	MF	1	1
Totals				13	13

Updated to match played June 18, 2018

=== Top assists ===
Rank	Nat.	Player	Pos.	United Soccer League	TOTAL
2	(Canada)	Liam Fraser	FW	1	1
2	(Canada)	Shaan Hundal	FW	1	1
1	(Argentina)	Mariano Miño	MF	2	2
1	(Canada)	Aidan Daniels	MF	2	2
2	(United States)	Ayo Akinola	FW	1	1
2	(United States)	Kyle Bjornethun	DF	1	1
2	(Canada)	Luca Uccello	MF	1	1
2	(Canada)	Luca Petrasso	MF	1	1
2	(Canada)	Malik Johnson	MF	1	1
Totals				11	11

Updated to match played June 18, 2018

=== Clean sheets ===
Rank	Nat.	Player	Pos.	United Soccer League	TOTAL
1	(Canada)	Angelo Cavalluzzo	GK	1	1
1	(Australia)	Caleb Patterson-Sewell	GK	1	1
Totals				2	2

Updated to match played April 30, 2018

=== Disciplinary record ===
No.	Pos.	Nat.	Player	United Soccer League		TOTAL	
No.	Pos.	Nat.	Player	Yellow card	Red card	Yellow card	Red card
19	FW	(United States)	Ben Spencer	2	0	2	0
20	FW	(United States)	Ayo Akinola	1	0	1	0
22	FW	(Canada)	Jordan Hamilton	1	0	1	0
27	MF	(Canada)	Liam Fraser	1	0	1	0
36	DF	(Germany)	Tim Kübel	1	0	1	0
37	MF	(Ghana)	Gideon Waja	1	0	1	0
38	DF	(United States)	Kyle Bjornethun	4	0	4	0
43	FW	(Trinidad and Tobago)	Aikim Andrews	2	0	2	0
45	MF	(Canada)	Luca Uccello	2	0	2	0
49	DF	(Canada)	Robert Boskovic	3	0	3	0
50	MF	(Canada)	Matthew Srbely	1	0	1	0
52	DF	(Canada)	Julian Dunn-Johnson	1	0	1	0
55	MF	(Canada)	Aidan Daniels	1	0	1	0
56	MF	(Canada)	Malik Johnson	1	0	1	0
61	DF	(Canada)	Antonio Rocco	2	0	2	0
64	MF	(Canada)	Shaan Hundal	0	1	0	1
70	GK	(Canada)	Gianluca Catalano	2	0	2	0
77	DF	(Switzerland)	Brandon Onkony	3	0	3	0
88	MF	(Argentina)	Mariano Miño	2	0	2	0
Totals				27	1	27	1

Updated to match played June 17, 2018
Source: Toronto FC
