= 2017 Toronto FC II season =

Toronto FC II
2017 season
- General Manager: Tim Bezbatchenko
- Head Coach: Jason Bent
- United Soccer League: Conference:15th; Overall:28th
- Top goalscorer: Shaan Hundal (7)
- Highest home attendance: 3,582 (September 9 vs. New York Red Bulls II)
- Lowest home attendance: 143 (September 2 vs. Rochester Rhinos)
- Average home league attendance: 1,089
Home colours	Away colours

The 2017 Toronto FC II season was the third season in the club's history. In 2016 the team finished 12th in the Eastern Conference and missed the playoffs.

== Roster ==
=== Players ===
As of October 15, 2017.
The squad of Toronto FC II will be composed of an unrestricted number of first-team players on loan to the reserve team, players signed to TFC II, and TFC Academy players. Academy players who appear in matches with TFC II will retain their college eligibility.

USL contracted players
No.	Position	Nation	Player
35	DF	USA	Lars Eckenrode
36	MF	USA	Brian James
42	DF	USA	Mitchell Taintor
43	FW	TRI	Aikim Andrews
45	MF	CAN	Luca Uccello
46	DF	USA	Jordan McCrary
48	MF	CAN	Dante Campbell
50	MF	CAN	Matthew Srbely
51	FW	TRI	Ricardo John
52	DF	CAN	Julian Dunn
54	MF	CAN	Ryan Telfer
55	MF	CAN	Aidan Daniels
56	FW	CAN	Malik Johnson
58	DF	CAN	Anthony Osorio
59	MF	CAN	Noble Okello
61	DF	CAN	Rocco Romeo
63	MF	CAN	Liam Fraser
64	FW	CAN	Shaan Hundal
72	DF	TRI	Jelani Peters
77	DF	SUI	Brandon Onkony
80	GK	CAN	Angelo Cavalluzzo
88	MF	PAN	Luis Pereira (on loan from Árabe Unido)

First team players who have been loaned to TFC II
No.	Position	Nation	Player
5	DF	CAN	Ashtone Morgan
9	MF	JPN	Tsubasa Endoh
12	DF	PUR	Jason Hernandez
14	MF	CAN	Jay Chapman
18	MF	USA	Marky Delgado
19	FW	USA	Ben Spencer
20	MF	CAN	Sergio Camargo
22	FW	CAN	Jordan Hamilton
27	DF	NOR	Øyvind Alseth
32	DF	USA	Brandon Aubrey
40	GK	USA	Mark Pais
44	MF	CAN	Raheem Edwards

TFC Academy call-ups
No.	Position	Nation	Player
49	DF	CAN	Robert Boskovic
57	DF	CAN	Andrew Dias
65	FW	CAN	Cyrus Rollocks
67	FW	CAN	Daniel Da Silva
70	GK	CAN	Gianluca Catalano
90	GK	CAN	Brogan Engbers

== Transfers ==
=== In ===
No.	Pos.	Player	Transferred from	Fee/notes	Date	Source
80	GK	(Canada) Angelo Cavalluzzo	(Canada) TFC Academy	Academy Signing	February 10, 2017	
40	GK	(United States) Mark Pais	(United States) Saint Louis FC	Free Transfer	March 7, 2017	
50	MF	(Canada) Matthew Srbely	(Canada) TFC Academy	Academy Signing	March 8, 2017	
46	DF	(United States) Jordan McCrary	(United States) New England Revolution	Free Transfer	March 9, 2017	
35	DF	(United States) Lars Eckenrode	(United States) Michigan Wolverines	Selected by Toronto FC in the 4th Round of the 2017 MLS SuperDraft	March 16, 2017	
54	MF	(Canada) Ryan Telfer	(Canada) York Lions	Free Transfer	March 24, 2017	
43	FW	(Trinidad and Tobago) Aikim Andrews	(Trinidad and Tobago) W Connection	Free Transfer	April 3, 2017	
77	DF	(Switzerland) Brandon Onkony	(Canada) FC Montreal	Free Transfer	April 18, 2017	
72	DF	(Trinidad and Tobago) Jelani Peters	(Trinidad and Tobago) W Connection	Loan deal made permanent.	May 19, 2017	
48	MF	(Canada) Dante Campbell	(Canada) TFC Academy	Academy Signing	July 26, 2017	
59	MF	(Canada) Noble Okello	(Canada) TFC Academy	Academy Signing	September 8, 2017	
61	DF	(Canada) Rocco Romeo	(Canada) TFC Academy	Academy Signing	September 15, 2017	
52	DF	(Canada) Julian Dunn	(Canada) TFC Academy	Academy Signing	September 15, 2017	

=== Loan In ===
No.	Pos.	Player	Loaned from	Fee/notes	Date	Source
72	DF	(Trinidad and Tobago) Jelani Peters	(Trinidad and Tobago) W Connection	Loan	April 3, 2017	
88	MF	(Panama) Luis Pereira	(Panama) Árabe Unido	Loan	April 27, 2017	

=== Out ===
No.	Pos.	Player	Transferred to	Fee/notes	Date	Source
32	DF	(United States) Wesley Charpie	(United States) Saint Louis FC	Free Transfer	November 22, 2016	
49	MF	(Jamaica) Martin Davis	(Jamaica) Harbour View	Option Declined	December 19, 2016	
34	DF	(Canada) Skylar Thomas	(United States) Charleston Battery	Contract Expired	December 19, 2016	
37	DF	(Canada) Adam Bouchard		Contract Expired	December 19, 2016	
31	FW	(Mexico) Sal Bernal		Contract Expired	December 19, 2016	
48	MF	(Canada) Raheem Edwards	(Canada) Toronto FC	Promoted to First team	March 2, 2017	
40	GK	(United States) Mark Pais	(Canada) Toronto FC	Promoted to First team	April 4, 2017	
19	FW	(United States) Ben Spencer	(Canada) Toronto FC	Promoted to First Team	May 2, 2017	

=== Loan Out ===
No.	Pos.	Player	Loaned to	Fee/notes	Date	Source
61	MF	(The Gambia) Bubacarr Jobe	(Sweden) Skövde AIK	2 Year Loan	March 7, 2017	

== Competitions ==
=== Preseason ===
March 3	Toronto FC II	2–1	Ottawa Fury	Toronto, Ontario
3:00PM	James 19', 43'		Dos Santos 10' (pen.)	Stadium: Kia Training Grounds

March 17	Rochester Rhinos	3–1	Toronto FC II	Victor, New York
1:30PM	82' (o.g.); Brown	Report	(o.g.)	Stadium: Pinnacle Athletic Facility

=== United Soccer League ===
==== League table ====
===== Eastern Conference =====
Pos	Team	Pld	W	D	L	GF	GA	GD	Pts
11	Harrisburg City Islanders	32	10	7	15	28	47	−19	37
12	Saint Louis FC	32	9	9	14	35	48	−13	36
13	Pittsburgh Riverhounds	32	8	12	12	33	42	−9	36
14	Richmond Kickers	32	8	8	16	24	36	−12	32
15	Toronto FC II	32	6	7	19	27	54	−27	25

Source: 2017 USL standings
Rules for classification: 1) total wins; 2) total goal differential; 3) total goals scored; 4) points earned against top four Conference finishers; 5) disciplinary points; 6) coin toss or drawing of lots

==== Results summary ====
Overall								Home						Away					
Pld	W	D	L	GF	GA	GD	Pts	W	D	L	GF	GA	GD	W	D	L	GF	GA	GD
32	6	7	19	27	54	−27	25	4	5	7	18	23	−5	2	2	12	9	31	−22

Last updated: October 15, 2017.
Source: USL

==== Results by round ====
Round	1	2	3	4	5	6	7	8	9	10	11	12	13	14	15	16	17	18	19	20	21	22	23	24	25	26	27	28	29	30	31	32
Ground	A	A	A	H	A	A	A	H	H	H	A	A	H	H	A	H	H	A	A	A	H	H	A	A	A	H	H	H	A	H	H	H
Result	W	L	L	D	D	D	L	L	L	D	L	L	D	W	L	L	W	L	L	L	W	D	L	L	W	D	L	L	L	W	L	L

Updated to match(es) played on October 15, 2017. Source: Regular season matches
A = Away; H = Home; W = Win; D = Draw; L = Loss

==== Matches ====
March 25	Phoenix Rising FC	0–1	Toronto FC II	Scottsdale, Arizona
10:30PM	Greer (yellow card) 65'; Gray (yellow card) 82'	Report	Telfer 8'; Onkony (yellow card) 89'	Stadium: Phoenix Rising FC Soccer Complex; Attendance: 6,890; Referee: Ramy Touchan

April 1	Tampa Bay Rowdies	4–0	Toronto FC II	St. Petersburg, Florida
7:30PM	Lowe 12', (yellow card) 76'; Hristov 20'; Cole 22'; Brown 70'	Report	Fraser (yellow card) 79'	Stadium: Al Lang Stadium; Attendance: 4,326; Referee: Caleb Mendez

April 4	Orlando City B	3–1	Toronto FC II	Orlando, Florida
7:30PM	Clowes (yellow card) 16', (goal) 18'; Carroll (yellow card) 38'; Barry 41'; Neal 51'; Laryea (yellow card) 55' da Silva (red card) 69'	Report	Johnson 30'; Brandon Onkony (yellow card) 57'	Stadium: Orlando City Stadium; Attendance: 1,098; Referee: Jonathan Weiner

April 7	Toronto FC II	0–0	Rochester Rhinos	Vaughan, Ontario
7:30PM	Spencer (yellow card) 80'	Report	Beresford (yellow card) 55'; Fall (yellow card) 90+3'	Stadium: Ontario Soccer Centre; Attendance: 525; Referee: David Barrie

April 22	Ottawa Fury FC	0–0	Toronto FC II	Ottawa, Ontario
2:00PM	Campbell (red card) 84'	Report	Uccello (yellow card) 18'; McCrary (yellow card) 74'; Aubrey (yellow card) 84'	Stadium: TD Place Stadium; Attendance: 6,502; Referee: Pierre-Luc Lauziere

April 29	Louisville City FC	0–0	Toronto FC II	Louisville, Kentucky
7:30PM	Spencer (yellow card) 61'; Ballard (yellow card) 80'	Report	James (yellow card) 29'	Stadium: Louisville Slugger Field; Attendance: 8,282; Referee: Ismir Pekmic

May 3	Pittsburgh Riverhounds	1–0	Toronto FC II	Pittsburgh, Pennsylvania
7:00PM	Souto 22'	Report		Stadium: Highmark Stadium; Attendance: 950; Referee: Matthew Franz

May 13	Toronto FC II	0–1	Bethlehem Steel FC	Toronto, Ontario
6:00PM		Report	Burke 8' (pen.); Nanco (yellow card) 66'	Stadium: BMO Field; Attendance: 3,033; Referee: Pierre-Luc Lauziere

May 19	Toronto FC II	1–3	Tampa Bay Rowdies	Vaughan, Ontario
5:00PM	Uccello 10'; Aubrey (yellow card) 45'; Spencer (yellow card) 62'; Alseth (yellow card) 83'	Report	Schäfer (yellow card) 58'; Collins (yellow card) 63'; Cole 68'; Paterson 80'; Jones 82'; Nanchoff (yellow card) 87'	Stadium: Ontario Soccer Centre; Attendance: 551; Referee: Carol Anne Chenard

May 24	Toronto FC II	0–0	Richmond Kickers	Vaughan, Ontario
12:00PM	Pereira (yellow card) 27'; Osorio (red card) 60'; Fraser (yellow card) 85'	Report	Shanosky (yellow card) 29'	Stadium: Ontario Soccer Centre; Attendance: 1,074; Referee: Silviu Petrescu

May 27	FC Cincinnati	1–0	Toronto FC II	Cincinnati, Ohio
7:00PM	König 18'; Delbridge (yellow card) 27'; Quinn (yellow card) 36'	Report	Alseth (yellow card) 84'	Stadium: Nippert Stadium; Attendance: 18,214; Referee: Guido Gonzalez Jr.

June 2	Saint Louis FC	2–0	Toronto FC II	Fenton, Missouri
8:30PM	Cochran 23'; Volesky 49'; Angulo (yellow card) 64'	Report		Stadium: World Wide Technology Soccer Park; Attendance: 4,477; Referee: Juan Guzman Jr.

June 10	Toronto FC II	1–1	Pittsburgh Riverhounds	Vaughan, Ontario
7:30PM	James (yellow card) 33'; Endoh 59'; Aubrey (yellow card) 64'; Hamilton (yellow card) 77'	Report	Parkes 87'	Stadium: Ontario Soccer Centre; Attendance: 761; Referee: Alexis Vaughan

June 14	Toronto FC II	1–0	Orlando City B	Vaughan, Ontario
12:00PM	Hamilton 9'	Report	Carroll (yellow card) 56'; Donovan (yellow card) 84'	Stadium: Ontario Soccer Centre; Attendance: 1,295; Referee: Pierre-Luc Lauziere

June 24	Charleston Battery	6–1	Toronto FC II	Charleston, South Carolina
7:00PM	Williams 31', 50'; Lasso 42'; Marinil 57', 71'; Carroll 90+2'	Report	Fraser (yellow card) 56'; Camargo 65'	Stadium: MUSC Health Stadium; Attendance: 4,571; Referee: Kevin Broadley

July 1	Toronto FC II	3–4	Harrisburg City Islanders	Vaughan, Ontario
5:00PM	Fraser (yellow card) 15'; Taintor 28'; Uccello 35'; Andrews 74'	Report	Ribeiro 23'; Bond 31'; Aubrey 48' (o.g.); Wilson 58'; Calvano (yellow card) 60'; Thomas (yellow card) 78'	Stadium: Ontario Soccer Centre; Attendance: 165; Referee: Yusri Rudolf

July 8	Toronto FC II	1–0	Ottawa Fury FC	Vaughan, Ontario
7:30PM	Campbell (yellow card) 36'; Uccello 73'; Telfer (yellow card) 90+2'	Report	Dixon (yellow card) 57'; Campbell (yellow card) 61' (yellow-red card) 90+5'	Stadium: Ontario Soccer Centre; Attendance: 1,007; Referee: David Barrie

July 21	New York Red Bulls II	1–0	Toronto FC II	Montclair, New Jersey
7:00PM	Bezecourt 27'; Tinari (yellow card) 55'	Report	Taintor (yellow card) 53'	Stadium: MSU Soccer Park at Pittser Field; Attendance: 600; Referee: Lorant Varga

July 26	Rochester Rhinos	2–0	Toronto FC II	Rochester, New York
7:05PM	Defregger 58', (yellow card) 59'; Dunn 76' (o.g.); Correia (yellow card) 90+3'	Report	Onkony (red card) 26'	Stadium: Capelli Sport Stadium; Attendance: 2,148; Referee: Jared Simons

July 29	Ottawa Fury FC	2–0	Toronto FC II	Ottawa, Ontario
7:00PM	Luboyera 24'; Seoane 75'	Report	Osorio (yellow card) 9'	Stadium: TD Place Stadium; Attendance: 6,763; Referee: Pierre-Luc Lauziere

August 5	Toronto FC II	1–0	Charleston Battery	Vaughan, Ontario
4:30PM	Hundal 52'; Dunn (yellow card) 90+2'	Report	Garbanzo (yellow card) 16'	Stadium: Ontario Soccer Centre; Attendance: 1,145; Referee: Chris Grabas

August 9	Toronto FC II	2–2	Charlotte Independence	Toronto, Ontario
7:30PM	Hamilton 49', 90+2'; Fraser (yellow card) 88'	Report	Pais 62' (o.g.); Smith (red card) 65'; Siaj 79'	Stadium: BMO Field; Attendance: 1,000; Referee: Marie-Soleil Beaudoin

August 13	Bethlehem Steel FC	3–1	Toronto FC II	Bethlehem, Pennsylvania
5:00PM	Real (yellow card) 28'; Tribbett (yellow card) 57'; Burke 58'; Jones (yellow card) 76'; Chambers 80' (pen.); Nanco 90+2'	Report	McCrary (yellow card) 28'; Dunn (yellow card) 50' (yellow-red card); James (yellow card) 66'; Taintor 73' (pen.)	Stadium: Goodman Stadium; Attendance: 3,072; Referee: Kevin Broadley

August 19	Richmond Kickers	2–1	Toronto FC II	Richmond, Virginia
7:00PM	Jane 5'; Imura (yellow card) 27'; Bolduc 68'	Report	Hamilton 4'; Srbely (yellow card) 67'; McCrary (yellow card) 84'; Campbell (yellow card) 90+4'	Stadium: City Stadium; Attendance: 5,059; Referee: Calin Radosav

August 26	Charlotte Independence	2–3	Toronto FC II	Matthews, North Carolina
7:00PM	E. Martínez 21'; Siaj 32'; A. Martínez (red card) 49'; Kalungi (yellow card) 64'	Report	Taintor (yellow card) 14'; Onkony (yellow card) 55'; Morgan 69'; Spencer 71'; Hamilton 76'; James (yellow card) 81'; Cavalluzzo (yellow card) 86'	Stadium: Mecklenburg County Sportsplex; Attendance: 1,429; Referee: Dustin Thorne

August 30	Toronto FC II	1–1	Saint Louis FC	Vaughan, Ontario
7:30PM	McCrary (yellow card) 80'; Hundal 90+3'; Telfer (yellow card) 90+4'	Report	Plewa (yellow card) 8'; Volesky 39'; Ledbetter (yellow card) 56'; Mirković (yellow card) 90+4'	Stadium: Ontario Soccer Centre; Attendance: 647; Referee: David Barrie

September 2	Toronto FC II	0–1	Rochester Rhinos	Vaughan, Ontario
7:30PM		Report	Brown 10'; Fall (yellow card) 90+2'	Stadium: Ontario Soccer Centre; Attendance: 143; Referee: Alexis Vaughan

September 9	Toronto FC II	1–2	New York Red Bulls II	Toronto, Ontario
8:00PM	Chapman 35'; Eckenrode (yellow card) 45'; Dunn (yellow card) 64'	Report	Metzger (yellow card) 31'; Bonomo 43' (pen.), 45+2' (pen.); Najem (yellow card) 90+2'	Stadium: BMO Field; Attendance: 3,582; Referee: Pierre-Luc Lauziere

September 16	Harrisburg City Islanders	2–1	Toronto FC II	Harrisburg, Pennsylvania
7:00PM	Calvano (yellow card) 35'; Opoku (yellow card) 39'; Bond (yellow card) 42'; Mensah 45+2', 50'; Wheeler (yellow card) 90+4'	Report	Hundal 14'; Romeo (yellow card) 91'	Stadium: FNB Field; Attendance: 2,775; Referee: Gustavo Solorio

September 27	Toronto FC II	1–0	Louisville City FC	Vaughan, Ontario
7:30PM	Fraser (yellow card) 52'; Hundal 73'	Report	Craig (yellow card) 86' (yellow-red card) 90'	Stadium: Ontario Soccer Centre; Attendance: 726; Referee: Yusri Rudolf

October 6	Toronto FC II	2–4	Bethlehem Steel FC	Vaughan, Ontario
7:30PM	Hundal 61', 88'	Report	Moar 19', 22'; Jones 53'; Conneh 81'	Stadium: Ontario Soccer Centre; Attendance: 647; Referee: David Barrie

October 14	Toronto FC II	3–4	FC Cincinnati	Vaughan, Ontario
7:30PM	Endoh 10', 31'; Spencer (yellow card) 27'; Hundal 53'; Onkony (yellow card) 90+2'; Taintor (yellow card) 90+4'	Report	Delbridge (yellow card) 29'; König 41'; Walker 49'; Fall 66'; Hoyte 86'	Stadium: Ontario Soccer Centre; Attendance: 1,119; Referee: Fabrizio Stasolla

== Statistics ==
=== Squad and statistics ===
As of October 15, 2017

No.	Pos	Nat	Player	Total		United Soccer League	
No.	Pos	Nat	Player	Apps	Goals	Apps	Goals
5	DF	(Canada) CAN	Ashtone Morgan	7	1	7+0	1
9	MF	(Japan) JPN	Tsubasa Endoh	14	3	13+1	3
12	DF	(Puerto Rico) PUR	Jason Hernandez	1	0	1+0	0
14	MF	(Canada) CAN	Jay Chapman	3	1	3+0	1
18	MF	(United States) USA	Marky Delgado	1	0	1+0	0
19	FW	(United States) USA	Ben Spencer	13	1	13+0	1
20	MF	(Canada) CAN	Sergio Camargo	18	1	12+6	1
22	FW	(Canada) CAN	Jordan Hamilton	9	5	8+1	5
27	DF	(Norway) NOR	Øyvind Alseth	17	0	13+4	0
32	DF	(United States) USA	Brandon Aubrey	21	0	20+1	0
35	DF	(United States) USA	Lars Eckenrode	7	0	6+1	0
36	MF	(United States) USA	Brian James	28	0	25+3	0
40	GK	(United States) USA	Mark Pais	13	0	13+0	0
42	DF	(United States) USA	Mitchell Taintor	24	2	24+0	2
43	FW	(Trinidad and Tobago) TRI	Aikim Andrews	15	1	10+5	1
44	MF	(Canada) CAN	Raheem Edwards	1	0	1+0	0
45	MF	(Canada) CAN	Luca Uccello	15	3	11+4	3
46	DF	(United States) USA	Jordan McCrary	26	0	19+7	0
48	MF	(Canada) CAN	Dante Campbell	11	0	4+7	0
49	DF	(Canada) CAN	Robert Boskovic	10	0	9+1	0
50	MF	(Canada) CAN	Matthew Srbely	4	0	3+1	0
51	FW	(Trinidad and Tobago) TRI	Ricardo John	10	0	3+7	0
52	DF	(Canada) CAN	Julian Dunn	13	0	12+1	0
54	MF	(Canada) CAN	Ryan Telfer	29	1	22+7	1
55	MF	(Canada) CAN	Aidan Daniels	16	0	9+7	0
56	FW	(Canada) CAN	Malik Johnson	19	1	11+8	1
58	DF	(Canada) CAN	Anthony Osorio	7	0	6+1	0
59	MF	(Canada) CAN	Noble Okello	1	0	0+1	0
61	DF	(Canada) CAN	Rocco Romeo	2	0	2+0	0
63	MF	(Canada) CAN	Liam Fraser	20	0	17+3	0
64	FW	(Canada) CAN	Shaan Hundal	22	7	17+5	7
67	FW	(Canada) CAN	Daniel Da Silva	2	0	1+1	0
72	DF	(Trinidad and Tobago) TRI	Jelani Peters	3	0	3+0	0
77	DF	(Switzerland) SUI	Brandon Onkony	20	0	10+10	0
80	GK	(Canada) CAN	Angelo Cavalluzzo	19	0	19+0	0
88	MF	(Panama) PAN	Luis Pereira	4	0	4+0	0

=== Goals and assists ===
Correct as of October 15, 2017

Goals
Pos.	Playing Pos.	Nation	Name	United Soccer League	Total
1	FW	(Canada)	Shaan Hundal	7	7
2	FW	(Canada)	Jordan Hamilton	5	5
3	MF	(Japan)	Tsubasa Endoh	3	3
3	MF	(Canada)	Luca Uccello	3	3
5	DF	(United States)	Mitchell Taintor	2	2
6	FW	(Trinidad and Tobago)	Aikim Andrews	1	1
6	MF	(Canada)	Sergio Camargo	1	1
6	MF	(Canada)	Jay Chapman	1	1
6	FW	(Canada)	Malik Johnson	1	1
6	DF	(Canada)	Ashtone Morgan	1	1
6	FW	(United States)	Ben Spencer	1	1
6	MF	(Canada)	Ryan Telfer	1	1
Total				27	27

Assists
Pos.	Playing Pos.	Nation	Name	United Soccer League	Total
1	MF	(Canada)	Ryan Telfer	4	4
2	MF	(Japan)	Tsubasa Endoh	3	3
2	FW	(United States)	Ben Spencer	3	3
4	FW	(Canada)	Jordan Hamilton	2	2
4	DF	(United States)	Jordan McCrary	2	2
6	DF	(Norway)	Øyvind Alseth	1	1
6	FW	(Trinidad and Tobago)	Aikim Andrews	1	1
6	MF	(Canada)	Sergio Camargo	1	1
6	MF	(Canada)	Liam Fraser	1	1
6	MF	(United States)	Brian James	1	1
6	FW	(Trinidad and Tobago)	Ricardo John	1	1
6	DF	(Switzerland)	Brandon Onkony	1	1
6	MF	(Canada)	Luca Uccello	1	1
Total				22	22

=== Clean sheets ===
Includes all competitive matches. Correct as of October 15, 2017

R	Pos	Nat	Name	United Soccer League	Total
1	GK	(Canada)	Angelo Cavalluzzo	6	6
2	GK	(United States)	Mark Pais	3	3
			Total	9	9

=== Disciplinary record ===
Correct as of October 15, 2017

No.	Pos.	Name	United Soccer League		Total	
No.	Pos.	Name	Booked	Sent off (straight red)	Booked	Sent off (straight red)
19	FW	(United States) Ben Spencer	3	0	3	0
22	FW	(Canada) Jordan Hamilton	1	0	1	0
27	DF	(Norway) Øyvind Alseth	3	0	3	0
32	DF	(United States) Brandon Aubrey	3	0	3	0
35	DF	(United States) Lars Eckenrode	1	0	1	0
36	MF	(United States) Brian James	4	0	4	0
42	DF	(United States) Mitchell Taintor	3	0	3	0
45	MF	(Canada) Luca Uccello	1	0	1	0
46	DF	(United States) Jordan McCrary	4	0	4	0
48	MF	(Canada) Dante Campbell	2	0	2	0
50	MF	(Canada) Matthew Srbely	1	0	1	0
52	DF	(Canada) Julian Dunn	2	1	2	1
54	MF	(Canada) Ryan Telfer	2	0	2	0
58	DF	(Canada) Anthony Osorio	1	1	1	1
61	DF	(Canada) Rocco Romeo	1	0	1	0
63	MF	(Canada) Liam Fraser	6	0	6	0
77	DF	(Switzerland) Brandon Onkony	4	1	4	1
80	GK	(Canada) Angelo Cavalluzzo	1	0	1	0
88	MF	(Panama) Luis Pereira	1	0	1	0
Total			44	3	44	3

== Recognition ==
=== USL Team of the Week ===
Week	Players	Bench	Opponent	Link
1		(Canada) Jay Chapman	Phoenix Rising FC	
5		(Canada) Angelo Cavalluzzo	Ottawa Fury FC	
6	(Canada) Angelo Cavalluzzo		Louisville City FC	
10		(United States) Mark Pais	Richmond Kickers & FC Cincinnati	
12		(Canada) Angelo Cavalluzzo	Pittsburgh Riverhounds	
13	(United States) Mitchell Taintor		Orlando City B	
15		(Canada) Luca Uccello	Harrisburg City Islanders	
16	(United States) Mark Pais	(Canada) Luca Uccello	Ottawa Fury	
20	(Canada) Julian Dunn	(Canada) Angelo Cavalluzzo	Charleston Battery	
21	(Canada) Jordan Hamilton		Charlotte Independence	
23		(United States) Ben Spencer	Charlotte Independence	
28	(Canada) Liam Fraser	(Canada) Shaan Hundal	Louisville City FC	
30		(Canada) Shaan Hundal	FC Cincinnati	

=== USL Goal of the Week ===
Week	Player	Opponent	Ref
16	(Canada) Luca Uccello	Ottawa Fury	

=== USL Save of the Week ===
Week	Player	Opponent	Ref
6	(Canada) Angelo Cavalluzzo	Louisville City FC	

=== USL Save of the Month ===
Month	Player	Opponent	Ref
March/April	(Canada) Angelo Cavalluzzo	Louisville City FC	

=== USL Save of the Year ===
Player	Opponent	Ref
(Canada) Angelo Cavalluzzo	Louisville City FC	
