= 2017 Toronto FC season =

Toronto FC 2017 soccer season

Toronto FC
2017 season
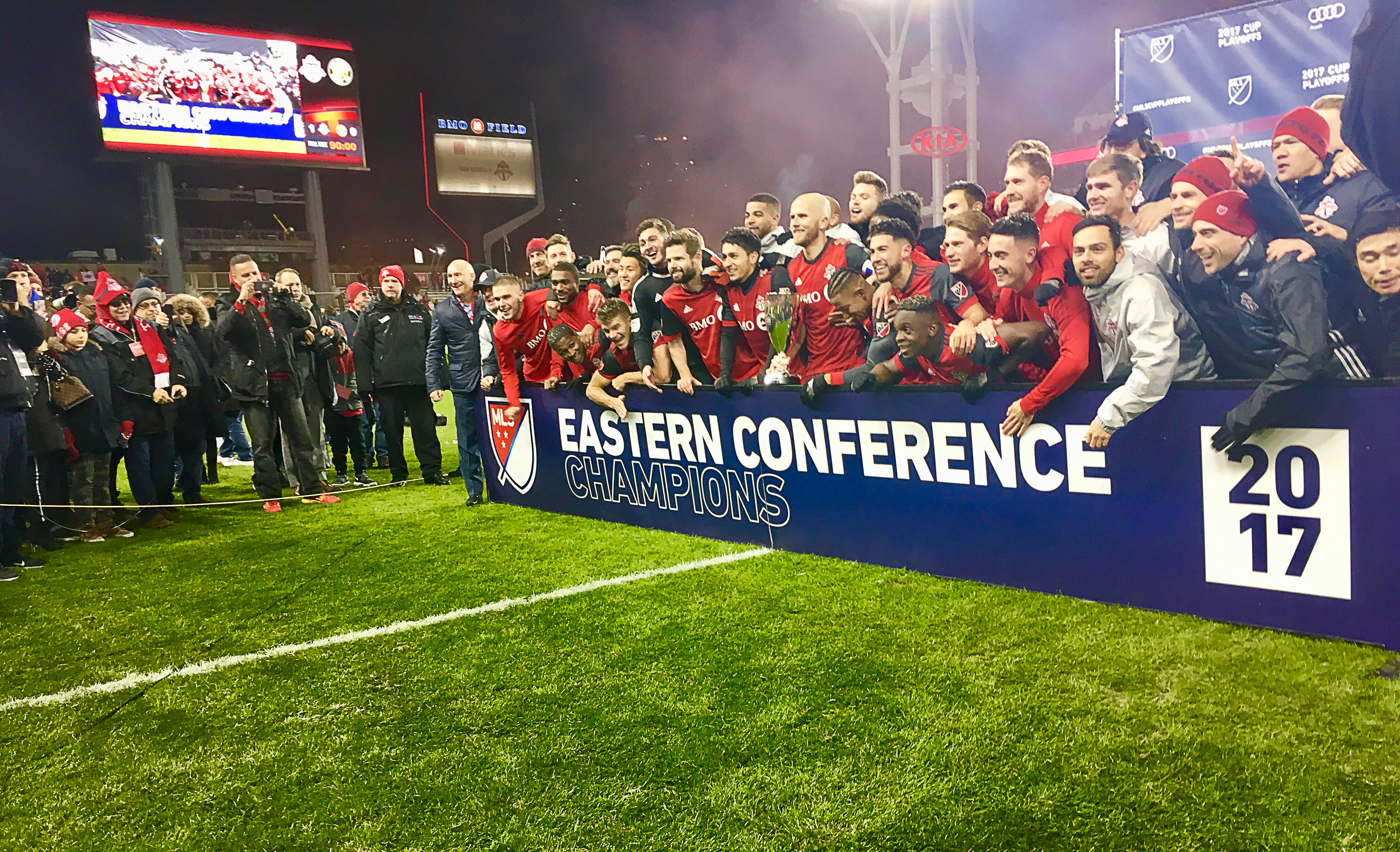
- Toronto FC players celebrating victory in the Eastern Conference final
- General manager: Tim Bezbatchenko
- Head coach: Greg Vanney
- Stadium: BMO Field
- Major League Soccer: Conference: 1st Overall: 1st
- MLS Cup playoffs: Winners
- Canadian Championship: Winners
- Top goalscorer: League: Sebastian Giovinco (16); All: Sebastian Giovinco (20)
- Highest home attendance: 30,584 (December 9 vs. Seattle Sounders FC, MLS Cup)
- Lowest home attendance: 15,175 (May 31 vs. Ottawa Fury FC, Canadian Championship)
- Average home league attendance: League: 27,647; All: 27,394
- Biggest win: 5–0 (May 26 vs. Columbus Crew)
- Biggest defeat: 0–3 (June 3 at New England Revolution)
Home colours	Away colours

The 2017 Toronto FC season was the 11th season in the history of Toronto FC.

On June 27, Toronto won a sixth Canadian Championship title following a 3–2 aggregate victory against the Montreal Impact, earning them a spot in the 2018 CONCACAF Champions League.

On September 30, the club officially clinched first place in the regular season standings after a 4–2 home win over the New York Red Bulls, becoming the first Canadian team to win the Supporters' Shield. Toronto drew 2–2 away to Atlanta United FC in their final regular season match on October 22; in doing so, they reached 69 points, breaking the MLS regular season record of 68. They also tied the league record for wins in a season with 20, and scored 74 goals, the joint-second highest seasonal tally ever.

Toronto won the Eastern Conference Championship on November 29 for a second consecutive season, defeating the Columbus Crew 1–0 over two legs. On December 9, in a rematch of the previous year's final, Toronto defeated Seattle Sounders FC 2–0 in MLS Cup 2017 at BMO Field, becoming the first MLS team to complete a domestic treble, as well as the first Canadian team to win the MLS Cup.

== Squad ==
As of December 9, 2017.

No.	Player	Nationality	Position(s)	Date of birth (age)	Signed in	Previous club	Notes
Goalkeepers
1	Clint Irwin	(United States)	GK	April 1, 1989 (aged 28)	2016	(United States) Colorado Rapids	
25	Alex Bono	(United States)	GK	April 25, 1994 (aged 23)	2015	(United States) Syracuse Orange	Generation Adidas
40	Mark Pais	(United States)	GK	June 3, 1991 (aged 26)	2017	(Canada) Toronto FC II	
Defenders
2	Justin Morrow	(United States)	LB / LWB / CB	October 4, 1987 (aged 30)	2013	(United States) San Jose Earthquakes	
3	Drew Moor	(United States)	CB	January 15, 1984 (aged 33)	2015	(United States) Colorado Rapids	
5	Ashtone Morgan	(Canada)	LB / LWB	February 9, 1991 (aged 26)	2011	(Canada) TFC Academy	Homegrown
6	Nick Hagglund	(United States)	CB	September 14, 1992 (aged 25)	2014	(United States) Xavier Musketeers	
12	Jason Hernandez	(Puerto Rico)	CB	August 26, 1983 (aged 34)	2017	(United States) New York City FC	
15	Eriq Zavaleta	(United States)	CB	August 2, 1992 (aged 25)	2015	(United States) Seattle Sounders FC	
23	Chris Mavinga	(Democratic Republic of the Congo)	CB / LB	May 26, 1991 (aged 26)	2017	(Russia) Rubin Kazan	International
26	Nicolas Hasler	(Liechtenstein)	RWB / CM	May 4, 1991 (aged 26)	2017	(Liechtenstein) Vaduz	International
27	Øyvind Alseth	(Norway)	RB / RWB / CB	August 13, 1994 (aged 23)	2017	(United States) Syracuse Orange	International
32	Brandon Aubrey	(United States)	CB	March 14, 1995 (aged 22)	2017	(United States) Notre Dame Fighting Irish	
33	Steven Beitashour	(Iran)	RB / RWB	February 1, 1987 (aged 30)	2015	(Canada) Vancouver Whitecaps FC	
Midfielders
4	Michael Bradley	(United States)	DM / CM	July 31, 1987 (aged 30)	2014	(Italy) Roma	Designated Player
7	Víctor Vázquez	(Spain)	AM	January 20, 1987 (aged 30)	2017	(Mexico) Cruz Azul	International
8	Benoît Cheyrou	(France)	DM / CM	May 3, 1981 (aged 36)	2015	(France) Marseille	International
9	Tsubasa Endoh	(Japan)	RW / AM	August 20, 1993 (aged 24)	2016	(United States) Maryland Terrapins	International
14	Jay Chapman	(Canada)	AM	January 1, 1994 (aged 23)	2015	(United States) Michigan State Spartans	Homegrown
18	Mark Delgado	(United States)	CM	May 16, 1995 (aged 22)	2014	(United States) Chivas USA	Homegrown
20	Sergio Camargo	(Canada)	CM / AM	August 16, 1994 (aged 23)	2017	(United States) Syracuse Orange	Homegrown
21	Jonathan Osorio	(Canada)	AM / CM	June 12, 1992 (aged 25)	2013	(Canada) SC Toronto	
31	Armando Cooper	(Panama)	CM / AM	November 26, 1987 (aged 30)	2016	(Panama) Árabe Unido	International
44	Raheem Edwards	(Canada)	LW / LWB	July 15, 1995 (aged 22)	2017	(Canada) Toronto FC II	
Forwards
10	Sebastian Giovinco	(Italy)	ST	January 26, 1987 (aged 30)	2015	(Italy) Juventus	Designated Player, International
17	Jozy Altidore	(United States)	CF	November 6, 1989 (aged 28)	2015	(England) Sunderland	Designated Player
19	Ben Spencer	(United States)	CF	March 28, 1995 (aged 22)	2017	(Canada) Toronto FC II	Homegrown
22	Jordan Hamilton	(Canada)	ST	March 17, 1996 (aged 21)	2014	(Canada) TFC Academy	Homegrown
87	Tosaint Ricketts	(Canada)	CF	August 6, 1987 (aged 30)	2016	(Turkey) Boluspor	

== Transfers ==
=== In ===
No.	Pos.	Player	Transferred from	Fee/notes	Date	Source
1	GK	(United States) Clint Irwin	(United States) Atlanta United FC	Acquired for Mark Bloom and GAM	December 13, 2016	
20	MF	(Canada) Sergio Camargo	(United States) Syracuse Orange	Signed as a Homegrown Player	January 11, 2017	
32	DF	(United States) Brandon Aubrey	(United States) Notre Dame Fighting Irish	Selected 21st overall in the 2017 MLS SuperDraft	January 13, 2017	
23	DF	(Democratic Republic of the Congo) Chris Mavinga	(Russia) Rubin Kazan	Free transfer	January 31, 2017	
7	MF	(Spain) Víctor Vázquez	(Mexico) Cruz Azul	Free transfer	February 20, 2017	
44	MF	(Canada) Raheem Edwards	(Canada) Toronto FC II	Promoted to first team	March 2, 2017	
47	DF	(Finland) Johan Brunell	(Finland) FF Jaro	Free transfer	March 16, 2017	
12	DF	(Puerto Rico) Jason Hernandez	(United States) New York City FC	Free transfer	March 21, 2017	
27	DF	(Norway) Øyvind Alseth	(United States) Syracuse Orange	Selected 65th overall in the 2017 MLS SuperDraft	March 22, 2017	
40	GK	(United States) Mark Pais	(Canada) Toronto FC II	Promoted to first team	April 4, 2017	
19	FW	(United States) Ben Spencer	(Canada) Toronto FC II	Promoted to first team	May 2, 2017	
26	DF	(Liechtenstein) Nicolas Hasler	(Liechtenstein) Vaduz	Free transfer	July 13, 2017	

==== Draft picks ====
Draft picks are not automatically signed to the team roster. Only those who are signed to a contract are listed as transfers in.

No.	Pos.	Player	Previous club	Notes	Date	Source
32	DF	(United States) Brandon Aubrey	(United States) Notre Dame Fighting Irish	MLS SuperDraft 1st Round Pick (#21)	January 13, 2017	
	GK	(Germany) Robert Moewes	(United States) Notre Dame Fighting Irish	MLS SuperDraft 3rd Round Pick (#52)	January 17, 2017	
27	DF	(Norway) Øyvind Alseth	(United States) Syracuse Orange	MLS SuperDraft 3rd Round Pick (#65)	January 17, 2017	
	DF	(United States) Lars Eckenrode	(United States) Michigan Wolverines	MLS SuperDraft 4th Round Pick (#83)	January 17, 2017	
	DF	(United States) Juan Pablo Saavedra	(United States) Virginia Tech Hokies	MLS SuperDraft 4th Round Pick (#87)	January 17, 2017	

=== Out ===
No.	Pos.	Player	Transferred to	Fee/notes	Date	Source
13	DF	(France) Clément Simonin	(France) Concarneau	Option declined	December 12, 2016	
20	MF	(Canada) Chris Mannella	(Canada) Vaughan Azzurri	Option declined	December 12, 2016	
19	MF	(United States) Daniel Lovitz	(Canada) Montreal Impact	Option declined	December 12, 2016	
40	GK	(Canada) Quillan Roberts	(Canada) Woodbridge Strikers	Contract expired	December 12, 2016	
23	DF	(United States) Josh Williams	(United States) Columbus Crew	Contract Expired, Selected in Stage 2 of the 2016 MLS Re-Entry Draft	December 12, 2016	
7	MF	(Canada) Will Johnson	(United States) Orlando City SC	Contract expired	December 12, 2016	
1	GK	(United States) Clint Irwin	(United States) Atlanta United FC	Selected in the 2016 MLS Expansion Draft	December 13, 2016	
28	DF	(United States) Mark Bloom	(United States) Atlanta United FC	Traded with GAM for Clint Irwin	December 13, 2016	
47	DF	(Finland) Johan Brunell	(Finland) JBK	Waived	April 6, 2017	
11	FW	(Canada) Molham Babouli	(Canada) Sigma FC	Waived	April 21, 2017	

== Competitions ==
=== Pre-season ===
February 1	Ventura County Fusion	0–3	Toronto FC	Irvine, California
6:00 PM		Report	Giovinco; Babouli	Stadium: Anteater Stadium

February 3	San Diego State Aztecs	0–3	Toronto FC	Irvine, California
6:00 PM		Report	Hamilton 20', Andrews	Stadium: Anteater Stadium

February 5	Cal State Fullerton Titans	2–1 (a.e.t.)	Toronto FC	Irvine, California
3:00 PM	55' (pen.); 92'	Report	Giovinco 15'	Stadium: Anteater Stadium

February 15	Miami FC	1–6	Toronto FC	Davenport, Florida
3:00 PM	Baggio	Report	Morrow; Giovinco (pen.); Cheyrou; Andrews; Edwards	Stadium: Champions Gate

February 19	Orlando City SC	1–3	Toronto FC	Davenport, Florida
2:00 PM	Kaká 43' (pen.)		Altidore 4'; Giovinco 84'; Morrow 85'	Stadium: Champions Gate
Note: Game 1 of 2

February 19	Orlando City SC	0–4	Toronto FC	Davenport, Florida
4:00 PM			Spencer; Andrews (o.g.); James	Stadium: Champions Gate
Note: Game 2 of 2

February 22	Toronto FC	3–0	Minnesota United FC	Davenport, Florida
3:00 PM	Giovinco 17', 23'; Hamilton 53'	Report		Stadium: Champions Gate

February 25 Suncoast Invitational	Toronto FC	1–4	Chicago Fire	St. Petersburg, Florida
3:00 PM	Ricketts 89' (pen.)		Juninho 9'; Nikolić 16' (pen.) de Leeuw 39', 74'	Stadium: Al Lang Stadium

=== Major League Soccer ===
==== League tables ====
===== Eastern Conference =====
Pos	Team	Pld	W	L	T	GF	GA	GD	Pts	Qualification
1	Toronto FC	34	20	5	9	74	37	+37	69	Qualification for the conference semifinals
2	New York City FC	34	16	9	9	56	43	+13	57	Qualification for the conference semifinals
3	Chicago Fire	34	16	11	7	62	48	+14	55	Qualification for the knockout round
4	Atlanta United FC	34	15	9	10	70	40	+30	55	Qualification for the knockout round
5	Columbus Crew	34	16	12	6	53	49	+4	54	Qualification for the knockout round

Source: MLS

===== Overall =====
Pos	Team	Pld	W	L	T	GF	GA	GD	Pts	Qualification
1	Toronto FC (C, S, V)	34	20	5	9	74	37	+37	69	Qualification for the CONCACAF Champions League
2	New York City FC	34	16	9	9	56	43	+13	57	
3	Chicago Fire	34	16	11	7	61	47	+14	55	
4	Atlanta United FC	34	15	9	10	70	40	+30	55	
5	Columbus Crew	34	16	12	6	53	49	+4	54	

Source: MLS
Rules for classification: 1) points; 2) total wins; 3) total goal differential; 4) total goals scored; 5) disciplinary points; 6) away goals scored; 7) away goal differential; 8) coin toss or drawing of lots
(C) MLS Cup champions; (S) Supporters' Shield winners; (V) Canadian Championship winners

==== Results summary ====
Overall								Home						Away					
Pld	W	D	L	GF	GA	GD	Pts	W	D	L	GF	GA	GD	W	D	L	GF	GA	GD
34	20	9	5	74	37	+37	69	13	3	1	45	15	+30	7	6	4	29	22	+7

Source: MLS

==== Results by round ====
Round	1	2	3	4	5	6	7	8	9	10	11	12	13	14	15	16	17	18	19	20	21	22	23	24	25	26	27	28	29	30	31	32	33	34
Ground	A	A	A	H	H	A	H	H	H	A	A	H	A	H	A	H	H	A	A	A	H	H	A	H	A	H	A	H	A	H	A	H	H	A
Result	D	D	W	D	D	L	W	W	W	W	W	W	D	W	L	W	W	L	W	D	D	W	D	W	W	W	W	W	W	L	L	W	W	D

Source: Regular season matches
A = Away; H = Home; W = Win; D = Draw; L = Loss

==== Matches ====
March 4 1	Real Salt Lake	0–0	Toronto FC	Sandy, Utah
4:30 PM	Schuler (yellow card) 23'; Rimando (yellow card) 29'; Sunny (yellow card) 72'	Report	Giovinco (penalty missed) 31', (yellow card) 82'; Hagglund (yellow card) 45'; Beitashour (yellow card) 53'; Altidore (yellow card) 90+3'	Stadium: Rio Tinto Stadium; Attendance: 19,519; Referee: Allen Chapman

March 11 2	Philadelphia Union	2–2	Toronto FC	Chester, Pennsylvania
4:30 PM	Simpson 11'; Bedoya (penalty missed) 33'; Fabinho (yellow card) 53'; Sapong 73'	Report	Altidore 45+2' (pen.); Zavaleta (yellow card) 52'; Cooper (yellow card) 57'; Morrow 71'	Stadium: Talen Energy Stadium; Attendance: 16,795; Referee: Mark Geiger

March 18 3	Vancouver Whitecaps FC	0–2	Toronto FC	Vancouver, British Columbia
4:00 PM	Shea (yellow card) 70' (yellow-red card) 70'	Report	Vázquez 76'; Altidore 80'; Bradley (yellow card) 87'	Stadium: BC Place; Attendance: 20,438; Referee: Ismail Elfath

March 31 4	Toronto FC	0–0	Sporting Kansas City	Toronto, Ontario
7:30 PM	Altidore (yellow card) 81'	Report	Ilie (yellow card) 69'; Sinovic (yellow card) 90+2'	Stadium: BMO Field; Attendance: 27,909; Referee: Alan Kelly

April 8 5	Toronto FC	2–2	Atlanta United FC	Toronto, Ontario
7:30 PM	Giovinco 20'; Morrow 44'; Hagglund (yellow card) 80'	Report	Larentowicz (yellow card) 10'; Villalba 15', 47', (yellow card) 18'; Asad (red card) 75'	Stadium: BMO Field; Attendance: 26,812; Referee: David Gantar

April 15 6	Columbus Crew	2–1	Toronto FC	Columbus, Ohio
8:00 PM	Kamara 37'; Meram 44'; Raitala (yellow card) 90+2'	Report	Altidore 21'; Bradley (yellow card) 80'	Stadium: Mapfre Stadium; Attendance: 12,319; Referee: Nima Saghafi

April 21 7	Toronto FC	3–1	Chicago Fire	Toronto, Ontario
7:30 PM	Giovinco 28', 82'; Zavaleta 32'; Osorio (yellow card) 85'	Report	McCarty (yellow card) 15'; Kappelhof (yellow card) 24'; Accam 88'	Stadium: BMO Field; Attendance: 27,097; Referee: Silviu Petrescu

April 28 8	Toronto FC	2–0	Houston Dynamo	Toronto, Ontario
7:30 PM	Altidore 16', 32'	Report	Elis (yellow card) 58'; Cabezas (yellow card) 70'	Stadium: BMO Field; Attendance: 25,358; Referee: Mark Geiger

May 3 9	Toronto FC	2–1	Orlando City SC	Toronto, Ontario
7:30 PM	Giovinco 9', 38'; Bono (yellow card) 50'; Altidore (yellow card) 52'; Bradley (yellow card) 90+3'	Report	Kaká 45+1'; Spector (yellow card) 74'; Higuita (yellow card) 85'	Stadium: BMO Field; Attendance: 25,200; Referee: Baldomero Toledo

May 6 10	Seattle Sounders FC	0–1	Toronto FC	Seattle, Washington
3:00 PM	Delem (yellow card) 13'; Alonso (yellow card) 46'	Report	Altidore 23' (pen.); Mavinga (yellow card) 70'	Stadium: CenturyLink Field; Attendance: 41,468; Referee: Jair Marrufo

May 10 11	Columbus Crew	1–2	Toronto FC	Columbus, Ohio
7:30 PM	Higuaín 28' (pen.); Steffen (yellow card) 37'; Jahn (yellow card) 82'	Report	Altidore (penalty missed) 38'; Ricketts 81', 90'	Stadium: Mapfre Stadium; Attendance: 10,318; Referee: Sorin Stoica

May 13 12	Toronto FC	3–2	Minnesota United FC	Toronto, Ontario
3:00 PM	Giovinco 20' (pen.); Ramirez 54' (o.g.); Ricketts 77'; Altidore (yellow card) 90+3'	Report	Molino 52', 62'	Stadium: BMO Field; Attendance: 27,249; Referee: Allen Chapman

May 19 13	New York Red Bulls	1–1	Toronto FC	Harrison, New Jersey
7:30 PM	Wright-Phillips 38'; Murillo (yellow card) 69'; Kljestan (yellow card) 81'; Robles (yellow card) 89'	Report	Bradley (yellow card) 37'; Cheyrou 70'; Altidore (penalty missed) 81', (yellow card) 82'	Stadium: Red Bull Arena; Attendance: 21,025; Referee: Robert Sibiga

May 26 14	Toronto FC	5–0	Columbus Crew	Toronto, Ontario
7:00 PM	Vázquez 6' (pen.), 59'; Morrow 39'; Delgado (red card) 81'; Osorio 86'; Hamilton 90+3'	Report	Mensah (yellow card) 5'	Stadium: BMO Field; Attendance: 25,376; Referee: Drew Fischer

June 3 15	New England Revolution	3–0	Toronto FC	Foxborough, Massachusetts
7:30 PM	Angoua 17', (yellow card) 27'; Fagúndez 66'; Farrell (yellow card) 71'; Agudelo 85'	Report	Cooper (yellow card) 26'	Stadium: Gillette Stadium; Attendance: 21,764; Referee: Armando Villarreal

June 17 16	Toronto FC	2–0	D.C. United	Toronto, Ontario
8:00 PM	Vázquez (yellow card) 27'; Giovinco (yellow card) 40'; Altidore 60', (yellow card) 65'; Bradley (yellow card) 68'; Hamilton 85'	Report	Opare (yellow card) 72'; Harkes (yellow card) 83'	Stadium: BMO Field; Attendance: 28,627; Referee: José Carlos Rivero

June 23 17	Toronto FC	2–0	New England Revolution	Toronto, Ontario
8:00 PM	Moor 11'; Giovinco (yellow card) 22', (goal) 90+6'; Altidore (yellow card) 52'	Report	Delamea (yellow card) 50'	Stadium: BMO Field; Attendance: 27,261; Referee: Hilario Grajeda

July 1 18	FC Dallas	3–1	Toronto FC	Frisco, Texas
7:00 PM	Lamah 5', 21', (yellow card) 15'; Harris (yellow card) 39'; Grana (yellow card) 54'; Figueroa (yellow card) 60'; Gruezo (yellow card) 76'; Urruti 78'; Akindele (yellow card) 90+2'	Report	Zavaleta (yellow card) 49'; Delgado 56'	Stadium: Toyota Stadium; Attendance: 14,984; Referee: Ricardo Salazar

July 5 19	Orlando City SC	1–3	Toronto FC	Orlando, Florida
7:30 PM	Spector (yellow card) 23'; Aja (yellow card) 45'; Rivas 63'	Report	Alseth (yellow card) 12'; Altidore 18'; Vázquez (yellow card) 45+4'; Giovinco 46', 65'	Stadium: Orlando City Stadium; Attendance: 25,029; Referee: Alan Kelly

July 19 20	New York City FC	2–2	Toronto FC	New York City, New York
7:30 PM	McNamara (yellow card) 23'; Villa 45+2'; Moralez 56'; Herrera (yellow card) 66'; Allen (yellow card) 90+1'	Report	Morgan 11', (yellow card) 70'; Moor (yellow card) 26'; Bono (yellow card) 34'; Vázquez 90+1' (pen.)	Stadium: Yankee Stadium; Attendance: 22,011; Referee: Jorge Gonzalez

July 22 21	Toronto FC	1–1	Colorado Rapids	Toronto, Ontario
7:00 PM	Chapman 5'; Mavinga (yellow card) 26'	Report	Sjöberg (yellow card) 44'; Badji 76'; Hairston (yellow card) 90+5'	Stadium: BMO Field; Attendance: 28,060; Referee: Juan Guzman

July 30 22	Toronto FC	4–0	New York City FC	Toronto, Ontario
2:00 PM	Giovinco 32', 67'; Altidore 75' (pen.); Edwards (yellow card) 80', (goal) 82'	Report	Callens (yellow card) 74'; Moralez (penalty missed) 90+3'	Stadium: BMO Field; Attendance: 29,203; Referee: Chris Penso

August 5 23	D.C. United	1–1	Toronto FC	Washington, D.C.
7:00 PM	Opare 6'; Franklin (yellow card) 38'; Sam (red card) 44'	Report	Delgado (yellow card) 11'; Bradley (yellow card) 36'; Birnbaum 52' (o.g.)	Stadium: RFK Stadium; Attendance: 16,444; Referee: Allen Chapman

August 12 24	Toronto FC	4–1	Portland Timbers	Toronto, Ontario
6:00 PM	Giovinco (yellow card) 53'; Morrow 58', 76'; Vázquez 72'; Delgado 87'	Report	Valeri 89'	Stadium: BMO Field; Attendance: 28,415; Referee: Kevin Stott

August 19 25	Chicago Fire	1–3	Toronto FC	Bridgeview, Illinois
8:00 PM	Accam 54'	Report	Bradley (yellow card) 5'; Delgado 14'; Hasler 63'; Zavaleta (yellow card) 75'; Giovinco 90'	Stadium: Toyota Park; Attendance: 21,891; Referee: Jair Marrufo

August 23 26	Toronto FC	3–0	Philadelphia Union	Toronto, Ontario
8:00 PM	Giovinco 10'; Hasler 30', (yellow card) 67'; Altidore 57'	Report	Fabinho (yellow card) 28'	Stadium: BMO Field; Attendance: 28,645; Referee: Armando Villarreal

August 27 27	Montreal Impact	1–3	Toronto FC	Montreal, Quebec
4:30 PM	Džemaili (yellow card) 45+2'; Cabrera (yellow card) 74'; Ciman (yellow card) 89'; Piatti 90+2'	Report	Giovinco 41', 90+3'; Altidore 52'; Zavaleta (yellow card) 78'	Stadium: Saputo Stadium; Attendance: 20,801; Referee: Robert Sibiga

September 9 28	Toronto FC	4–0	San Jose Earthquakes	Toronto, Ontario
5:00 PM	Vázquez 26'; Altidore 48', 64'; Osorio 66'	Report	Godoy (yellow card) 43'; Ureña (yellow card) 57'; Cerén (red card) 72'	Stadium: BMO Field; Attendance: 29,050; Referee: José Carlos Rivero

September 16 29	LA Galaxy	0–4	Toronto FC	Carson, California
10:30 PM	Jamieson (yellow card) 29'; Smith (yellow card) 80'	Report	Moor 24'; Ricketts 37', 76'; Vázquez 78'	Stadium: StubHub Center; Attendance: 19,650; Referee: Kevin Stott

September 20 30	Toronto FC	3–5	Montreal Impact	Toronto, Ontario
7:30 PM	Boldor 42' (o.g.); Ricketts 77', 79'	Report	Piatti 10', 24'; Donadel 12'; Jackson-Hamel 47', 51'	Stadium: BMO Field; Attendance: 28,898; Referee: Jair Marrufo

September 23 31	New England Revolution	2–1	Toronto FC	Foxborough, Massachusetts
5:00 PM	Nguyen 82'; Kamara 87', (yellow card) 90+3'	Report	Vázquez (yellow card) 61'; Hasler 84'	Stadium: Gillette Stadium; Attendance: 19,303; Referee: Alan Kelly

September 30 32	Toronto FC	4–2	New York Red Bulls	Toronto, Ontario
7:00 PM	Morrow 32', 37', 90+1'; Vázquez 80' (pen.); Altidore (yellow card) 82'	Report	Verón 39'; Robles (yellow card) 52'; Royer 77' (pen.)	Stadium: BMO Field; Attendance: 28,979; Referee: Allen Chapman

October 15 33	Toronto FC	1–0	Montreal Impact	Toronto, Ontario
5:00 PM	Altidore 16'; Bradley (yellow card) 26'; Giovinco (penalty missed) 45+3'; Cheyrou (yellow card) 90'	Report	Camara (yellow card) 23'; Džemaili (yellow card) 29'; Crépeau (yellow card) 45+3'; Cabrera (yellow card) 59'	Stadium: BMO Field; Attendance: 27,866; Referee: Ted Unkel

October 22 34	Atlanta United FC	2–2	Toronto FC	Atlanta, Georgia
4:00 PM	Asad 31' (pen.); Larentowicz (yellow card) 52'; Martínez 74'	Report	Altidore 60'; Mavinga (yellow card) 67'; Giovinco 84'	Stadium: Mercedes-Benz Stadium; Attendance: 71,874; Referee: Robert Sibiga

=== MLS Cup Playoffs ===
==== Conference Semifinals ====
October 30 First leg	New York Red Bulls	1–2	Toronto FC	Harrison, New Jersey
7:00 PM	Royer 45+3' (pen.); Perrinelle (yellow card) 80'	Report	Vázquez 8'; Giovinco 72', (yellow card) 82'	Stadium: Red Bull Arena; Attendance: 18,107; Referee: Drew Fischer

November 5 Second leg	Toronto FC	0–1 (2–2 (a) agg.)	New York Red Bulls	Toronto, Ontario
3:00 PM	Altidore (yellow card) 34', (red card) 45+2'; Bradley (yellow card) 45+2'; Giovinco (yellow card) 80'	Report	Kljestan (yellow card) 34', (red card) 45+2'; Wright-Phillips 53', (yellow card) 71'; Felipe (yellow card) 90+2'	Stadium: BMO Field; Attendance: 29,974; Referee: Chris Penso

==== Conference Finals ====
November 21 First leg	Columbus Crew	0–0	Toronto FC	Columbus, Ohio
8:00 PM	Artur (yellow card) 33'; Pedro Santos (yellow card) 52'; Mensah (yellow card) 54'	Report	Osorio (yellow card) 68'; Edwards (yellow card) 85'	Stadium: Mapfre Stadium; Attendance: 21,289; Referee: Robert Sibiga

November 29 Second leg	Toronto FC	1–0 (1–0 agg.)	Columbus Crew	Toronto, Ontario
7:30 PM	Vázquez (penalty missed) 26'; Altidore 60'; Bradley (yellow card) 78'	Report	Mensah (yellow card) 86'	Stadium: BMO Field; Attendance: 30,392; Referee: Ismail Elfath

==== MLS Cup ====
December 9 MLS Cup 2017	Toronto FC	2–0	Seattle Sounders FC	Toronto, Ontario
4:00 PM	Altidore 67'; Vázquez 90+4', (yellow card) 90+5'	Report		Stadium: BMO Field; Attendance: 30,584; Referee: Allen Chapman

=== Canadian Championship ===
==== Semi-finals ====
May 23 First leg	Ottawa Fury	2–1	Toronto FC	Ottawa, Ontario
7:00 PM	Williams 57' (pen.); Seoane 72', (yellow card) 78'	Report	Cheyrou 35'; Taintor (yellow card) 56'; Edwards (yellow card) 86' (yellow-red card) 90+2'	Stadium: TD Place Stadium; Attendance: 7,611; Referee: Pierre-Luc Lauziere

May 31 Second leg	Toronto FC	4–0 (5–2 agg.)	Ottawa Fury	Toronto, Ontario
7:00 PM	Edward 41' (o.g.); Endoh 42'; Delgado 80'; Giovinco 85'	Report		Stadium: BMO Field; Attendance: 15,175; Referee: Geoff Gamble

==== Final ====
June 21 First leg	Montreal Impact	1–1	Toronto FC	Montreal, Quebec
7:30 PM	Mancosu 19'; Duvall (yellow card) 32'; Piatti (penalty missed) 55'; Tabla (yellow card) 82'; Donadel (yellow card) 84'; Džemaili (yellow card) 90'	Report	Altidore 30'; Hamilton (yellow card) 45+2'; Zavaleta (yellow card) 64'; Mavinga (yellow card) 89'	Stadium: Saputo Stadium; Attendance: 14,329; Referee: Silviu Petrescu

June 27 Second leg	Toronto FC	2–1 (3–2 agg.)	Montreal Impact	Toronto, Ontario
7:30 PM	Giovinco 53', 90+5'	Report	Tabla 36'; Fisher (yellow card) 45+2'; Bernardello (yellow card) 59'; Bernier (red card) 90'	Stadium: BMO Field; Attendance: 26,539; Referee: David Gantar

=== Competitions summary ===
Competition	Record								First Match	Last Match	Final Position
Competition	Pld	W	D	L	GF	GA	GD	Win %	First Match	Last Match	Final Position
MLS Regular Season	34	20	9	5	74	37	+37	58.82	March 4	October 22	1st East, 1st Overall
MLS Cup Playoffs	5	3	1	1	5	2	+3	60.00	October 30	December 9	Champions
Canadian Championship	4	2	1	1	8	4	+4	50.00	May 23	June 27	Champions
Total	43	25	11	7	87	43	+44	58.14			

Source: Competitions

== Statistics ==
=== Squad and statistics ===
No.	Pos	Nat	Player	Total		Major League Soccer		MLS Cup Playoffs		Canadian Championship	
No.	Pos	Nat	Player	Apps	Goals	Apps	Goals	Apps	Goals	Apps	Goals
1	GK	(United States) USA	Clint Irwin	10	0	6+0	0	0+0	0	4+0	0
2	DF	(United States) USA	Justin Morrow	36	8	28+0	8	5+0	0	2+1	0
3	DF	(United States) USA	Drew Moor	34	2	24+1	2	5+0	0	3+1	0
4	MF	(United States) USA	Michael Bradley	37	0	30+0	0	5+0	0	2+0	0
5	DF	(Canada) CAN	Ashtone Morgan	6	1	3+2	1	0+0	0	0+1	0
6	DF	(United States) USA	Nick Hagglund	19	0	13+2	0	0+4	0	0+0	0
7	MF	(Spain) ESP	Víctor Vázquez	39	10	28+3	8	5+0	2	2+1	0
8	MF	(France) FRA	Benoît Cheyrou	16	2	7+6	1	0+1	0	2+0	1
9	MF	(Japan) JPN	Tsubasa Endoh	6	1	3+1	0	0+0	0	2+0	1
10	FW	(Italy) ITA	Sebastian Giovinco	32	20	25+0	16	4+0	1	1+2	3
12	DF	(Puerto Rico) PUR	Jason Hernandez	9	0	5+3	0	0+0	0	1+0	0
14	MF	(Canada) CAN	Jay Chapman	13	1	3+9	1	0+0	0	1+0	0
15	DF	(United States) USA	Eriq Zavaleta	36	1	27+2	1	3+1	0	3+0	0
17	FW	(United States) USA	Jozy Altidore	33	18	25+2	15	4+0	2	1+1	1
18	MF	(United States) USA	Mark Delgado	34	4	25+1	3	4+1	0	1+2	1
19	FW	(United States) USA	Ben Spencer	3	0	2+1	0	0+0	0	0+0	0
20	MF	(Canada) CAN	Sergio Camargo	0	0	0+0	0	0+0	0	0+0	0
21	MF	(Canada) CAN	Jonathan Osorio	36	2	9+18	2	3+2	0	4+0	0
22	FW	(Canada) CAN	Jordan Hamilton	11	2	0+8	2	0+0	0	3+0	0
23	DF	(Democratic Republic of the Congo) COD	Chris Mavinga	34	0	24+2	0	5+0	0	3+0	0
25	GK	(United States) USA	Alex Bono	34	0	28+1	0	5+0	0	0+0	0
26	DF	(Liechtenstein) LIE	Nicolas Hasler	12	3	9+1	3	1+1	0	0+0	0
27	DF	(Norway) NOR	Øyvind Alseth	4	0	4+0	0	0+0	0	0+0	0
31	MF	(Panama) PAN	Armando Cooper	24	0	10+9	0	0+4	0	1+0	0
32	DF	(United States) USA	Brandon Aubrey	0	0	0+0	0	0+0	0	0+0	0
33	DF	(Iran) IRI	Steven Beitashour	29	0	17+4	0	5+0	0	2+1	0
40	GK	(United States) USA	Mark Pais	0	0	0+0	0	0+0	0	0+0	0
42	DF	(United States) USA	Mitchell Taintor	1	0	0+0	0	0+0	0	1+0	0
44	MF	(Canada) CAN	Raheem Edwards	25	1	10+11	1	0+1	0	3+0	0
87	FW	(Canada) CAN	Tosaint Ricketts	26	7	9+13	7	1+0	0	2+1	0

=== Goals and assists ===
Goals
Rank	Pos.	Nation	Player	Major League Soccer	MLS Cup Playoffs	Canadian Champ	Total
1	FW	(Italy)	Sebastian Giovinco	16	1	3	20
2	FW	(United States)	Jozy Altidore	15	2	1	18
3	MF	(Spain)	Víctor Vázquez	8	2	0	10
4	DF	(United States)	Justin Morrow	8	0	0	8
5	FW	(Canada)	Tosaint Ricketts	7	0	0	7
6	MF	(United States)	Mark Delgado	3	0	1	4
7	DF	(Liechtenstein)	Nicolas Hasler	3	0	0	3
8	MF	(France)	Benoît Cheyrou	1	0	1	2
8	FW	(Canada)	Jordan Hamilton	2	0	0	2
8	DF	(United States)	Drew Moor	2	0	0	2
8	MF	(Canada)	Jonathan Osorio	2	0	0	2
12	MF	(Canada)	Jay Chapman	1	0	0	1
12	MF	(Canada)	Raheem Edwards	1	0	0	1
12	MF	(Japan)	Tsubasa Endoh	0	0	1	1
12	DF	(Canada)	Ashtone Morgan	1	0	0	1
12	DF	(United States)	Eriq Zavaleta	1	0	0	1
Own goals				3	0	1	4
Total				76	3	8	87

Assists
Rank	Pos.	Nation	Player	Major League Soccer	MLS Cup Playoffs	Canadian Champ	Total
1	MF	(Spain)	Víctor Vázquez	16	1	3	20
2	MF	(Canada)	Raheem Edwards	6	0	2	8
2	FW	(Italy)	Sebastian Giovinco	6	1	1	8
4	FW	(United States)	Jozy Altidore	6	0	0	6
5	DF	(Iran)	Steven Beitashour	5	0	0	5
5	MF	(United States)	Mark Delgado	5	0	0	5
7	MF	(United States)	Michael Bradley	2	0	1	3
7	FW	(Canada)	Jordan Hamilton	1	0	2	3
7	MF	(Canada)	Jonathan Osorio	3	0	0	3
10	MF	(Panama)	Armando Cooper	2	0	0	2
10	DF	(Democratic Republic of the Congo)	Chris Mavinga	2	0	0	2
10	DF	(United States)	Justin Morrow	1	0	1	2
10	FW	(United States)	Ben Spencer	2	0	0	2
14	GK	(United States)	Alex Bono	1	0	0	1
14	MF	(Japan)	Tsubasa Endoh	1	0	0	1
14	DF	(Liechtenstein)	Nicolas Hasler	1	0	0	1
14	DF	(United States)	Drew Moor	1	0	0	1
14	FW	(Canada)	Tosaint Ricketts	1	0	0	1
Total				62	2	10	74

=== Shutouts ===
Rank	Pos.	Nat.	Player	Major League Soccer	MLS Cup Playoffs	Canadian Championship	Total
1	GK	(United States)	Alex Bono	11*	3	0	14
2	GK	(United States)	Clint Irwin	3*	0	1	4
			Total	14	3	1	18

* Includes one shared clean sheet against Sporting Kansas City.

=== Disciplinary record ===
Correct as of December 9, 2017

No.	Pos.	Player	Major League Soccer		MLS Cup Playoffs		Canadian Championship		Total	
No.	Pos.	Player	Yellow card	Red card	Yellow card	Red card	Yellow card	Red card	Yellow card	Red card
3	DF	(United States) Drew Moor	1	0	0	0	0	0	1	0
4	MF	(United States) Michael Bradley	8	0	2	0	0	0	10	0
5	DF	(Canada) Ashtone Morgan	1	0	0	0	0	0	1	0
6	DF	(United States) Nick Hagglund	2	0	0	0	0	0	2	0
7	MF	(Spain) Víctor Vázquez	3	0	1	0	0	0	4	0
8	MF	(France) Benoît Cheyrou	1	0	0	0	0	0	1	0
10	FW	(Italy) Sebastian Giovinco	4	0	2	0	0	0	6	0
15	DF	(United States) Eriq Zavaleta	4	0	0	0	1	0	5	0
17	FW	(United States) Jozy Altidore	8	0	1	1	0	0	9	1
18	MF	(United States) Mark Delgado	1	1	0	0	0	0	1	1
21	MF	(Canada) Jonathan Osorio	1	0	1	0	0	0	2	0
22	FW	(Canada) Jordan Hamilton	0	0	0	0	1	0	1	0
23	DF	(Democratic Republic of the Congo) Chris Mavinga	3	0	0	0	1	0	4	0
25	GK	(United States) Alex Bono	2	0	0	0	0	0	2	0
26	DF	(Liechtenstein) Nicolas Hasler	1	0	0	0	0	0	1	0
27	DF	(Norway) Øyvind Alseth	1	0	0	0	0	0	1	0
31	MF	(Panama) Armando Cooper	2	0	0	0	0	0	2	0
33	DF	(Iran) Steven Beitashour	1	0	0	0	0	0	1	0
42	DF	(United States) Mitchell Taintor	0	0	0	0	1	0	1	0
44	MF	(Canada) Raheem Edwards	1	0	1	0	2	1	4	1
Total			45	1	8	1	6	1	59	3

== Honours ==
=== MLS Team of the Week ===
Week	Starters	Bench	Opponent(s)	Ref.
3		(United States) Jozy Altidore	Vancouver Whitecaps FC	
5		(United States) Alex Bono (Canada) Raheem Edwards	Sporting Kansas City	
8	(United States) Eriq Zavaleta (United States) Michael Bradley (Italy) Sebastian Giovinco	(Spain) Víctor Vázquez	Chicago Fire	
9	(Canada) Raheem Edwards (United States) Jozy Altidore	(United States) Mark Delgado	Houston Dynamo	
10	(United States) Justin Morrow	(Italy) Sebastian Giovinco (United States) Greg Vanney	Orlando City SC; Seattle Sounders FC	
11	(Canada) Tosaint Ricketts	(United States) Alex Bono (United States) Greg Vanney	Columbus Crew; Minnesota United FC	
13	(Spain) Víctor Vázquez		Columbus Crew	
16	(United States) Michael Bradley	(Italy) Sebastian Giovinco	D.C. United	
17	(United States) Drew Moor		New England Revolution	
19	(Italy) Sebastian Giovinco	(United States) Jozy Altidore	Orlando City SC	
21	(United States) Drew Moor (United States) Michael Bradley (Italy) Sebastian Giovinco	(Democratic Republic of the Congo) Chris Mavinga	New York City FC	
23	(United States) Justin Morrow (United States) Mark Delgado	(United States) Greg Vanney	Portland Timbers	
24	(United States) Mark Delgado	(United States) Michael Bradley	Chicago Fire	
25	(Spain) Víctor Vázquez (Italy) Sebastian Giovinco	(United States) Alex Bono (United States) Michael Bradley	Philadelphia Union; Montreal Impact	
27	(Iran) Steven Beitashour (United States) Drew Moor (Spain) Víctor Vázquez (United States) Jozy Altidore	(United States) Greg Vanney	San Jose Earthquakes	
28	(United States) Michael Bradley (Spain) Víctor Vázquez	(Canada) Tosaint Ricketts (United States) Greg Vanney	LA Galaxy	
30	(United States) Justin Morrow (United States) Jozy Altidore	(United States) Greg Vanney	New York Red Bulls	

=== MLS Player of the Week ===
Week	Player	Week's statline
8	(Italy) Sebastian Giovinco	2 Goals
21	(Italy) Sebastian Giovinco	2 Goals 1 Assist
23	(United States) Justin Morrow	2 Goals
25	(Italy) Sebastian Giovinco	3 Goals
27	(United States) Jozy Altidore	2 Goals
30	(United States) Justin Morrow	3 Goals

=== MLS Save of the Week ===
Week	Player	Ref.
17	(United States) Alex Bono	
25	(United States) Alex Bono	

=== George Gross Memorial Trophy ===
Player	Ref.
(Italy) Sebastian Giovinco	

=== End of season awards ===
Award	Recipient(s)	Ref.
MLS Coach of the Year	(United States) Greg Vanney	
MLS Best XI	(United States) Justin Morrow (Spain) Víctor Vázquez (Italy) Sebastian Giovinco	
CONCACAF Coach of the Year	(United States) Greg Vanney	
