= Matthew Srbely =

Canadian professional soccer player (born 1998)

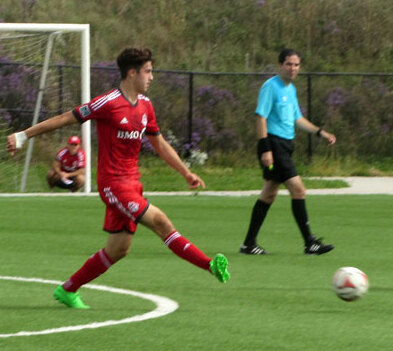
- Srbely in 2015 with Toronto FC Academy

Personal information
- Date of birth: November 29, 1998 (age 27)
- Place of birth: Brampton, Ontario, Canada
- Height: 1.84 m (6 ft 0 in)
- Position: Midfielder

Youth career
- Brampton Youth SC
- North Mississauga SC
- Toronto FC

Senior career*
Years	Team	Apps	(Gls)
2016–2018	Toronto FC III	34	(5)
2017–2020	Toronto FC II	51	(7)
2020	→ Thisted (loan)	5	(0)
2021–2022	Tampa Bay Rowdies	12	(0)
2022	→ Cork City (loan)	22	(1)
Total		124	(13)
- * Club domestic league appearances and goals as of October 21, 2022

Matthew Srbely (born November 29, 1998) is a Canadian former professional soccer player.

== Career ==
A product of the Toronto FC Academy, Srbely played with Toronto FC III's Premier Development League and League1 Ontario sides in 2016 before moving to their United Soccer League side in 2017, signing his first professional contract with Toronto FC II on March 8, 2017. He made his professional debut on August 13, 2017 in a 3-1 loss to Bethlehem Steel, coming on as a 68th-minute midfield substitute for Aikim Andrews. He received his first professional start on August 19, 2017 away against the Richmond Kickers. Srbely became a regular fixture in the Toronto FC II lineup in 2018, finishing second on the team in games played with 19, logging the third most minutes with 2,078.

He scored his first professional goal on March 17, 2018 against New York Red Bulls II. He was awarded USL First Team of the Week honours for his performance after leading Toronto FC II to its first victory of the season, a 2-0 victory over Nashville SC, adding a goal and an assist. The following season he was named to the USL League One Team of the Week three times. Due to the COVID-19 pandemic, Toronto FC II withdrew from the 2020 USL League One season and, in September 2020, Srbely was loaned to Danish 2nd Division club Thisted FC until the end of the 2020 season. He made five appearances with Thisted FC before their season was abruptly postponed in Denmark due to COVID-19 concerns in the North Jutland region of Denmark in early November 2020.

On February 18, 2021, Srbely signed a two-year deal with USL Championship club Tampa Bay Rowdies. He made his debut on May 1 against Charlotte Independence.

On February 2, 2022, Srbely joined Cork City in the League of Ireland First Division on a season-long loan. He made his debut on February 18 in a substitute appearance against Bray Wanderers.

== Career statistics ==
As of October 21, 2022

Club	League	Season	League		Playoffs		Domestic Cup		League Cup		Total	
Club	League	Season	Apps	Goals	Apps	Goals	Apps	Goals	Apps	Goals	Apps	Goals
Toronto FC III	PDL	2016	14	1	—		—		—		14	1
Toronto FC III	League1 Ontario	2016	3	0	—		—		0	0	3	0
Toronto FC III	League1 Ontario	2017	15	4	—		—		1	0	16	4
Toronto FC III	League1 Ontario	2018	2	0	—		—		0	0	2	0
Toronto FC III	Total		34	5	0	0	0	0	1	0	35	5
Toronto FC II	USL	2017	4	0	—		—		—		4	0
Toronto FC II	USL	2018	29	3	—		—		—		29	3
Toronto FC II	USL League One	2019	18	4	—		—		—		18	4
Toronto FC II	Total		51	7	0	0	0	0	0	0	51	7
Thisted FC (loan)	2. division	2020–21	5	0	—		0	0	—		5	0
Tampa Bay Rowdies	USL	2021	12	0	0	0	—		—		12	0
Cork City (loan)	League of Ireland First Division	2022	22	1	1	0	0	0	0	0	23	1
Career Total			124	13	1	0	0	0	1	0	126	13
