= Angelo Cavalluzzo =

Canadian soccer player

Personal information
- Date of birth: March 1, 1993 (age 33)
- Place of birth: Hamilton, Ontario, Canada
- Height: 1.82 m (6 ft 0 in)
- Position: Goalkeeper

Youth career
- 2012–2013: Toronto FC

Senior career*
Years	Team	Apps	(Gls)
2012–2013	TFC Academy		
2014	Niagara United	17	(0)
2015	Toronto FC III	2	(0)
2016–2018	Toronto FC II	29	(0)

Managerial career
- 2019–: Toronto Varsity Blues women
- 2019: Hamilton United II
- 2020–2021: Hamilton United (women)
- 2022–2025: Alliance United (women)
- * Club domestic league appearances and goals as of October 16, 2018

Angelo Cavalluzzo (born March 1, 1993) is a Canadian former professional soccer player who played as a goalkeeper. He currently serves as the head coach for Toronto Varsity Blues women's soccer.

== Playing career ==
Cavalluzzo began his career in 2012 with TFC Academy in the Canadian Soccer League, and in 2014 played with Niagara United. He returned to TFC Academy in 2015 to play in the USL Premier Development League. Cavalluzzo would receive degrees in bio and chemical engineering while playing for McMaster University during this time.

In 2016, Cavalluzo was signed by Toronto FC II of the United Soccer League, where he appeared in 5 matches on an emergency basis. He made his debut on June 6, 2016 against Harrisburg City Islanders. On February 10, 2017 he extended his contract for the 2017 season. Cavalluzzo would be nominated for USL player of the month for March/April 2017, after making 18 saves and earning 3 clean sheets during that time. Upon completion of the 2017 season, Cavalluzzo would re-sign with the club for the 2018 season. Cavalluzzo would be a valuable player to Toronto FC II early in the 2018 season, but would ultimately see his season cut short in May after rupturing his achilles tendon.

== Coaching career ==
He served as an assistant coach for the McMaster Marauders university men's and women's soccer teams from 2016-2018. In 2018, he became an analyst for the TFC Academy as well as serving as the University of Toronto Varsity Blues soccer assistant coach. In April 2019, he was named as the Varsity Blues women's soccer head coach. In 2019, he was appointed the head coach for Hamilton United's reserve team in League1 Ontario and served as an assistant and goalkeeper coach with the Toronto FC Academy. In 2020, he was named the head coach for Hamilton United's women's team in League1 Ontario.

In 2022, he began coaching the Alliance United FC women's team in League1 Ontario. In 2023, he was named the league's Coach of the Year.

== Career statistics ==
=== Club ===
As of May 11, 2018

Club	League	Season	League		Playoffs		Cup		Total	
Club	League	Season	Apps	Goals	Apps	Goals	Apps	Goals	Apps	Goals
Toronto FC II	USL	2016	4	0	—		—		4	0
Toronto FC II	USL	2017	19	0	—		—		19	0
Toronto FC II	USL	2018	5	0	—		—		5	0
Career Total			28	0	0	0	0	0	28	0
