= Julian Dunn =

Canadian soccer player (born 2000)

- Dunn in 2026

Personal information
- Full name: Julian Fletcher Dunn-Johnson
- Date of birth: July 11, 2000 (age 26)
- Place of birth: Toronto, Ontario, Canada
- Height: 1.91 m (6 ft 3 in)
- Position: Centre-back

Team information
- Current team: Atlético Ottawa

Youth career
- Vaughan SC
- Brampton Youth SC
- Toronto FC

Senior career*
Years	Team	Apps	(Gls)
2016–2017	Toronto FC III	11	(0)
2017	Toronto FC II	13	(0)
2018–2021	Toronto FC	3	(0)
2018–2019	→ Toronto FC II (loan)	17	(0)
2020	→ Valour FC (loan)	7	(0)
2021	→ Toronto FC II (loan)	4	(0)
2022–2024	HamKam	4	(0)
2024–2025	HFX Wanderers FC	15	(0)
2026–	Atlético Ottawa	9	(0)

International career^{‡}
2017	Canada U17	3	(0)
2018	Canada U20	4	(0)
2018	Canada U23	3	(0)
- * Club domestic league appearances and goals as of November 2, 2026 ‡ National team caps and goals as of November 10, 2018

Julian Fletcher Dunn-Johnson (born July 11, 2000) is a Canadian professional soccer player who plays as a centre-back for Atlético Ottawa in the Canadian Premier League.

== Club career ==
=== Toronto FC II ===
On June 29, 2017, Dunn joined USL club Toronto FC II on loan. He made his debut in a 4–3 defeat to the Harrisburg City Islanders on July 1. Dunn was sent off for the first time in his career during a 3–1 defeat at the Bethlehem Steel on August 13.

=== Toronto FC ===
On April 13, 2018, Dunn signed as a homegrown player with MLS side Toronto FC. In doing so, he became the 18th homegrown player to sign for the first team from the academy, and the sixth player to complete the club's full player pathway. The following day, Dunn made his debut as a 76th-minute substitute in a 2–0 defeat to the Colorado Rapids. Dunn would have his option for the 2020 season exercised by Toronto, keeping him with the club. He has been loaned to the second team on occasion.

On August 10, 2020, Dunn was loaned to Canadian Premier League side Valour FC. He made his debut for Valour on August 16 against Cavalry FC. Dunn played every single minute for Valour in the 2020 season, and his solid performances for the club were recognized as he was nominated for the league's U21 Canadian Player of the Year Award, which was eventually won by Mohamed Farsi.

Upon his return to Toronto for the 2021 MLS season, Dunn featured sparingly due to a number of injuries, ultimately only making two appearances for the first team throughout the year. Upon the conclusion of the season, his contract expired and Dunn departed the club.

=== HamKam ===
In December 2021, Eliteserien club HamKam announced they had signed Dunn on a two-year deal. He made his debut for HamKam in their season-opener against Lillestrøm on April 2, 2022. In late May, he suffered a season ending injury. Dunn would miss almost two full seasons due to the injury, returning to the pitch in January 2024 after 20 months away.

=== HFX Wanderers FC ===
In February 2024, Dunn signed with Canadian Premier League club HFX Wanderers FC for the 2024 season, with an option for 2025. He made his debut for the club on April 13, in the season opener, against Pacific FC.

=== Atlético Ottawa ===
In late June 2026, Dunn signed a one-year contract, with an option for 2027 with Atlético Ottawa.

== International career ==
Dunn is eligible to represent Canada as well as Jamaica, as his father was born in Saint Mary and his mother in Hanover.

In April 2017, Dunn-Johnson was named in Canada's 20-man squad for the 2017 CONCACAF Under-17 Championship. He made his international debut in a 2–1 defeat to Costa Rica on April 22. He made two further appearances in the competition against Cuba and Suriname. In May 2018, Dunn-Johnson was named to Canada's under-21 squad for the 2018 Toulon Tournament. He was named to the Canadian U20 team for the 2018 CONCACAF U-20 Championship on October 24, 2018. Dunn-Johnson was named to the Canadian U-23 provisional roster for the 2020 CONCACAF Men's Olympic Qualifying Championship on February 26, 2020.

== Career statistics ==
As of October 27, 2025

Club	League				Playoffs		Domestic Cup		Continental		Total	
Club	Season	Division	Apps	Goals	Apps	Goals	Apps	Goals	Apps	Goals	Apps	Goals
Toronto FC III	2016	PDL	3	0	—		—		—		3	0
Toronto FC III	2016	League1 Ontario	2	0	—		0	0	—		2	0
Toronto FC III	2017	League1 Ontario	6	0	—		1 (Note: Appearances in the League1 Ontario League Cup)	0	—		7	0
Toronto FC III	Total		11	0	0	0	1	0	0	0	9	0
Toronto FC II	2017	USL	13	0	—		—		—		13	0
Toronto FC II	2018	USL	9	0	—		—		—		9	0
Toronto FC II	2019	USL League One	8	0	—		—		—		8	0
Toronto FC II	2021	USL League One	4	0	—		—		—		4	0
Toronto FC II	Total		34	0	0	0	0	0	0	0	34	0
Toronto FC	2018	Major League Soccer	2	0	—		0	0	0	0	2	0
Toronto FC	2019	Major League Soccer	0	0	0	0	0	0	0	0	0	0
Toronto FC	2021	Major League Soccer	1	0	—		1	0	0	0	2	0
Toronto FC	Total		3	0	0	0	1	0	0	0	4	0
Valour FC (loan)	2020	Canadian Premier League	7	0	—		—		—		7	0
HamKam	2022	Eliteserien	4	0	0	0	0	0	0	0	4	0
HFX Wanderers	2024	Canadian Premier League	10	0	–		1	0	0	0	11	0
HFX Wanderers	2025	Canadian Premier League	5	0	0	0	0	0	–		5	0
HFX Wanderers	Total		15	0	0	0	1	0	0	0	16	0
Total			74	0	0	0	3	0	0	0	77	0
