= Daniel Da Silva (soccer, born 1998) =

Canadian soccer player

Personal information
- Date of birth: March 28, 1998 (age 28)
- Place of birth: Toronto, Ontario, Canada
- Height: 1.75 m (5 ft 9 in)
- Position: Forward

Youth career
- Rush Canada
- Benfica
- Toronto FC

Senior career*
Years	Team	Apps	(Gls)
2017–2018	Toronto FC III	18	(11)
2017–2018	Toronto FC II	3	(0)
2018	Alliance United FC	3	(0)
- * Club domestic league appearances and goals as of December 15, 2019

Daniel Da Silva (born March 28, 1998) is a Canadian former soccer player who plays as a forward.

== Early life ==
During his youth career, Da Silva played for the Rush Canada Soccer Academy. In 2015, he went to Portugal joining the S.L. Benfica U18 team. He later returned to Canada, joining the Toronto FC Academy.

== Career ==
While with Toronto FC Academy, he made his debut with Toronto FC III in League1 Ontario on April 30, 2017, scoring a goal in a 6–0 win over FC London. He finished the season with 11 goals for second most for the team behind Cyrus Rollocks, who scored 17 goals.

He made his professional debut for Toronto FC II in the second-tier USL on September 28, 2017 in a substitute appearance against Louisville City FC. He made his first professional start a week later, on October 7 against Bethlehem Steel F.C.

Afterwards in 2018, he played with Alliance United FC.

== Career statistics ==
As of December 15, 2018

Club	Season	League			Domestic Cup		League Cup		Continental		Total	
Club	Season	Division	Apps	Goals	Apps	Goals	Apps	Goals	Apps	Goals	Apps	Goals
Toronto FC III	2017	League1 Ontario	17	11	–		?	?	–		17	11
Toronto FC III	2018	League1 Ontario	1	0	–		0	0	–		1	0
Toronto FC II	2017	USL	2	0	–		–		–		2	0
Toronto FC II	2018	USL	1	0	–		–		–		1	0
Alliance United FC	2018	League1 Ontario	3	0	0	0	–		0	0	3	0
Career total			24	11	0	0	0	0	0	0	24	11
