= Gideon Waja =

Ghanaian footballer (born 1996)

Personal information
- Date of birth: December 15, 1996 (age 29)
- Place of birth: Accra, Ghana
- Height: 1.65 m (5 ft 5 in)
- Position: Midfielder

Youth career
- WAFA

Senior career*
Years	Team	Apps	(Gls)
2015–2018	WAFA	59+	(5+)
2018–2020	Toronto FC II	32	(0)
2020–2022	AFC Leopards		
2023–2024	Hamilton United	14	(0)

International career^{‡}
2011	Ghana U17	3	(0)
2017	Ghana	3	(1)
- * Club domestic league appearances and goals as of June 9, 2024 ‡ National team caps and goals as of February 24, 2018

Gideon Waja (born December 15, 1996) is a Ghanaian footballer.

== Club career ==
Waja began his senior career with West African Football Academy in 2015, where he served as vice-captain. Afterwards, he became the team's captain in 2017. At the end of the 2016 season, the club received transfer offers from Aduana Stars and Kotoko, but he ultimately remained with WAFA. In November 2017, he began training with Kuwaiti side Qadsia SC. In November 2017, it was announced that Waja would leave the club after the season with Major League Soccer clubs New York City FC and Toronto FC were being linked as potentially interested clubs.

In February 2018, he signed with Canadian side Toronto FC II in the USL. In 2020, the club opted out of the 2020 season due to the COVID-19 pandemic, resulting in Waja not playing that season. In March 2020, he returned to Ghana, and began training with his former club WAFA, while were also interested in signing him.

In November 2020, he signed with Kenyan Premier League club AFC Leopards on a one-year contract, with an option to extend for an additional year.

In 2023, he played with Hamilton United in League1 Ontario.

== International career ==
Waja played at the youth level with Ghana U17.

In June 2015, he attended a camp with the Ghana national team ahead of the 2015 COSAFA Cup, but did not make the final squad. On May 25, 2017, Waja made his international debut at senior level in a 1–1 draw against Benin with the Ghana B team (it counted as a full international, but a majority of the main squad players were not called up). On 12 August 2017, he scored against Burkina Faso in the 2018 African Nations Championship qualification matches. In September 2017, he was called up for two FIFA World Cup qualifying matches against Congo, with was his first call-up with the full Ghanaian team, but was an unused substitute in both matches. He then won the 2017 WAFU Cup of Nations with the national B team.

== Career statistics ==
=== Club ===
As of June 9, 2024

Club	League	Season	League		Playoffs		Domestic Cup		Other		Total	
Club	League	Season	Apps	Goals	Apps	Goals	Apps	Goals	Apps	Goals	Apps	Goals
WAFA	Ghana Premier League	2016	26	1	–		–		–		26	1
WAFA	Ghana Premier League	2017	33	4	–		–		–		33	4
WAFA	Total		59	5	–		–		–		59	5
Toronto FC II	USL	2018	18	0	–		–		–		18	0
Toronto FC II	USL League One	2019	14	0	–		–		–		14	0
Toronto FC II	Total		32	0	–		–		–		32	0
Hamilton United	League1 Ontario	2023	8	0	–		–		8	0		
Hamilton United	League1 Ontario	2024	6	0	–		–		1	0	7	0
Hamilton United	Total		14	0	–		–		1	0	15	0
Career total			105	5	0	0	1	0	106	5		

=== International goals ===
Scores and results list Ghana's goal tally first.

No.	Date	Venue	Opponent	Score	Result	Competition
1.	12 August 2017	Stade du 4 Août, Ouagadougou, Burkina Faso	Burkina Faso	2–1	2–2	2018 African Nations Championship qualification
