= Kyle Bjornethun =

American soccer player

Personal information
- Full name: Kyle Timothy Bjornethun
- Date of birth: March 16, 1995 (age 31)
- Place of birth: Snohomish, Washington, U.S.
- Height: 1.82 m (6 ft 0 in)
- Position: Defender

Team information
- Current team: Phoenix Rising
- Number: 13

Youth career
- 2011–2012: Seattle Sounders FC

College career
Years	Team	Apps	(Gls)
2013–2016	Seattle Redhawks	85	(10)

Senior career*
Years	Team	Apps	(Gls)
2014	Seattle Sounders FC U-23	1	(0)
2015	Puget Sound Gunners	2	(0)
2016	Seattle Sounders FC U-23	12	(0)
2017	Portland Timbers 2	26	(0)
2018	Toronto FC II	26	(0)
2019	FC Tucson	8	(0)
2019	→ Phoenix Rising	5	(0)
2020	Phoenix Rising	1	(0)
Total		81	(0)
- * Club domestic league appearances and goals

Kyle Bjornethun (born March 16, 1995) is an American former professional soccer player who played as a defender.

== Career ==
=== Amateur and college ===
Bjornethun attended Glacier Peak High School in Snohomish, Washington, where he helped the soccer team to a 3A state title in 2010. On February 6, 2013, he signed a National Letter of Intent to play college soccer at Seattle University.

Bjornethun played four years for the Seattle Redhawks between 2013 and 2016. He was named a second-team All-American in 2015 and was a two-time Western Athletic Conference (WAC) Defensive Player of the Year in 2015 and 2016. Bjornethun was inducted into the school's Athletics Hall of Fame as a member of the class of 2023.

Bjornethun also appeared for USL PDL sides Seattle Sounders FC U-23 and Puget Sound Gunners.

=== Professional ===
On January 17, 2017, Bjornethun was selected in the fourth round, with the final pick of the draft (88th overall), of the 2017 MLS SuperDraft by Seattle Sounders FC. However, he instead signed for United Soccer League side Portland Timbers 2. Bjornethun made his USL an Portland Timbers 2 debut on March 25, 2017, against Real Monarchs.

== Career statistics ==
As of May 20, 2018

Season	Team	League	LgRank	Matches Played	Minutes	Goals	Assists	Y Card	R Card
2017	Timbers 2	USL Championship	30th	26	2,037	0	1	3	0
2018	Toronto FC II	USL Championship	33rd	26	2,120	0	1	6	0
2019	FC Tucson	USL League One	8th	8	720	0	0	1	0
2019	Phoenix Rising	USL Championship	1st	5	272	0	1	1	0
2020	Phoenix Rising	USL Championship	2nd	1	58	0	0	0	0
4 Seasons	4 Clubs			66	5,207	0	3	11	0
