= Borja Angoitia =

Spanish footballer (born 1992)

Personal information
- Full name: Borja Angoitia Etxeberría
- Date of birth: 23 April 1992 (age 34)
- Place of birth: Bilbao, Spain
- Height: 1.88 m (6 ft 2 in)
- Position: Goalkeeper

Team information
- Current team: Toronto FC II
- Number: 30

Youth career
- 2001–2011: Arenas Getxo

College career
| Years | Team | Apps | (Gls) |
| 2011–2014 | Quinnipiac Bobcats | 68 | (0) |

Senior career*
| Years | Team | Apps | (Gls) |
| 2014 | Ocean City Nor'easters | 6 | (0) |
| 2015–2016 | Deusto | 18 | (0) |
| 2016 | FC Tucson | 9 | (0) |
| 2016 | Amorebieta | 9 | (0) |
| 2017 | Rio Grande Valley FC Toros | 14 | (0) |
| 2018 | Toronto FC II | 5 | (0) |
- * Club domestic league appearances and goals as of 08:47, 16 October 2018 (UTC)

Borja Angoitia Etxeberría (born 23 April 1992) is a Spanish footballer who plays as a goalkeeper.

== Career ==
Angoitia played four years of college soccer at Quinnipiac University between 2011 and 2014, where he made a total of 68 appearances. While at Quinnipiac, he also appeared for USL PDL side Ocean City Nor'easters in 2014.

Out of college, Angoitia signed with clubs in Spain and the United States, appearing for SD Deusto, FC Tucson and Amorebieta before joining United Soccer League side Rio Grande Valley FC Toros in March 2017. In 2018, he joined Canadian side Toronto FC II.
