= Johan Brunell =

Finnish footballer (born 1991)

Personal information
- Date of birth: May 29, 1991 (age 35)
- Place of birth: Jakobstad, Finland
- Height: 1.91 m (6 ft 3 in)
- Position: Defender

Team information
- Current team: FF Jaro
- Number: 6

Youth career
- 2003–2008: Jaro
- 2009: TPS

Senior career*
Years	Team	Apps	(Gls)
2010–2016	Jaro	90	(5)
2011	→ JBK (loan)	10	(0)
2017	Toronto FC	0	(0)
2017	JBK	4	(0)
2018–	Jaro	160	(13)
- * Club domestic league appearances and goals as of 13 November 2026

Johan Brunell (born May 29, 1991) is a Finnish footballer who plays for FF Jaro as a centre-back.

== Club career ==
=== FF Jaro ===
Brunell began his professional career in the Finnish Veikkausliiga with FF Jaro. He stayed with the club in 2016 when they were relegated to the Ykkönen. In January 2014 Brunell was offered a contract by German 3. Liga club Chemnitzer FC but could not reach an agreement on the terms of the contract.

=== Toronto FC ===
On March 16, 2017, Toronto FC announced that they had signed Brunell to a contract after he spent time as a trialist during the 2017 pre-season. Brunell was waived just two weeks later, without making an appearance for the club.

== Honours ==
Jaro

- Ykkösliiga runner-up: 2024
