= Ricardo John =

Trinidadian professional footballer (born 1995)

Personal information
- Date of birth: 10 April 1995 (age 31)
- Place of birth: Arouca, Trinidad and Tobago
- Height: 1.91 m (6 ft 3 in)
- Position: Forward

Team information
- Current team: Harrisburg Heat

College career
| Years | Team | Apps | (Gls) |
| 2014–2015 | Virginia Tech | | |

Senior career*
| Years | Team | Apps | (Gls) |
| 2015–2016 | Central FC | | |
| 2016–2017 | Toronto FC II | 14 | (3) |
| 2017 | Toronto FC III | 2 | (2) |
| 2018 | Luis Ángel Firpo | 40 | (7) |
| 2019 | Queen's Park | | |
| 2019–2021 | Juticalpa | | |
| 2021– | Harrisburg Heat (indoor) | 0 | (0) |

International career^{‡}
| 2015 | Trinidad and Tobago U20 | 3 | (0) |
| 2015 | Trinidad and Tobago U23 | 5 | (4) |
| 2017–2018 | Trinidad and Tobago | 2 | (0) |
- * Club domestic league appearances and goals ‡ National team caps and goals as of 27 October 2021

Ricardo John (born 10 April 1995) is a Trinidadian professional footballer who plays for Harrisburg Heat in the Major Arena Soccer League.

== Club career ==
=== Toronto FC II ===
On 3 August 2016, John signed with United Soccer League side Toronto FC II, the reserve team of Major League Soccer club Toronto FC. He also played two games for the third team, scoring twice.

=== Luis Ángel Firpo ===
John signed with Luis Ángel Firpo for the Clausura 2018 tournament. John contributed to that the team which was saved from relegation.

John re-signed with Luis Ángel Firpo for the Apertura 2018 tournament. With the team of Usulután John experienced a serious economic, administrative and sports crisis during the tournament and serious delays in salary payments. Days later John left the team.

=== Juticalpa ===
On 22 August 2019, John signed with Juticalpa in Honduras.

=== Harrisburg Heat ===
In October 2021, John entered the Major Arena Soccer League by signing with the Harrisburg Heat.
