= Brandon Onkony =

Swiss footballer (born 1997)

Personal information
- Date of birth: 2 December 1997 (age 28)
- Place of birth: Montreux, Switzerland
- Height: 1.90 m (6 ft 3 in)
- Position: Centre-back

Team information
- Current team: Bulle
- Number: 4

Youth career
- La Tour-de-Peilz
- 2013: Lausanne-Sport
- 2014: Montreux-Sports
- 2015: Montreal Impact
- 2017: Toronto FC

Senior career*
Years	Team	Apps	(Gls)
2016	FC Montreal	7	(0)
2017	Toronto FC III	4	(0)
2017–2018	Toronto FC II	29	(0)
2019	Kjellerup	7	(0)
2019–2020	Hobro	12	(0)
2020–2022	Helsingør	4	(0)
2022–2023	Chiasso	15	(0)
2023	Stade Lausanne Ouchy	0	(0)
2023	Varesina	11	(0)
2023–2024	Atletico Castegnato	18	(0)
2024	Cairese	15	(2)
2025–	Bulle	21	(0)
- * Club domestic league appearances and goals as of 22 June 2026

Brandon Onkony (born 2 December 1997) is a Swiss professional footballer who plays as a defender for Swiss Promotion League club Bulle.

== Career ==
=== Youth ===
Onkony played for Montreux Sports and Lausanne-Sports, in his native Switzerland as a youth player.

In 2015 he joined Montreal Impact's Academy U18. He played 15 games for 1 goal and helped the team to reach the Playoffs.

=== FC Montreal ===
On 10 June 2016 FC Montreal announced the signing of Onkony to an Academy contract, although he was promoted to play with the USL professional team He made his debut against FC Cincinnati the following day, appearing as a substitute in the 76th minute. He made a further 7 appearances for FC Montreal in 2016.

=== Toronto FC II ===
On 18 April 2017 Toronto FC II announced the signing of Brandon Onkony to a professional contract. He made his debut in the first game of the season against Phoenix Rising, appearing as a substitute in the 70th minute.

Onkony also spent time with Toronto FC III at the beginning of the season making four appearances.

=== Hobro IK ===
Onkony arrived in Denmark in the winter 2019. He spent time with Hobro IK reserves team where he played 6 games and with Kjellerup IF where he played 7 games.

On 3 June 2019 Hobro IK announced, that Onkony officially had joined the club on a one-year contract. Hobro confirmed in July 2020, that they did not agree on the terms of a new contract and that he would not extend his stay at the club.

=== FC Helsingør ===
On the 24 August 2020 FC Helsingør announced, that Brandon Onkony had joined the club. He signed a two-year contract with the club. During the two years in Helsingør, Onkony only made seven appearances, before leaving in June 2022, as his contract expired.

=== Chiasso ===
On 11 August 2022, Onkony signed with Chiasso.
