= Jordan McCrary =

American soccer player (born 1993)

Personal information
- Full name: Jordan Christopher McCrary
- Date of birth: July 28, 1993 (age 33)
- Place of birth: Alpharetta, Georgia, United States
- Height: 1.76 m (5 ft 9 in)
- Position: Defender

College career
Years	Team	Apps	(Gls)
2011–2015	North Carolina Tar Heels	86	(1)

Senior career*
Years	Team	Apps	(Gls)
2011	Reading United	1	(0)
2014–2015	Carolina Dynamo	3	(0)
2016	New England Revolution	0	(0)
2016	→ Rochester Rhinos (loan)	1	(0)
2017	Toronto FC II	26	(0)
2018	Seattle Sounders FC	15	(0)
2018	→ Seattle Sounders FC 2 (loan)	4	(0)
2019–2021	Sacramento Republic	65	(1)

International career
- United States U17
- United States U18
- United States U20
- * Club domestic league appearances and goals as of November 8, 2021

Jordan Christopher McCrary (born July 28, 1993) is an American soccer player who plays as a defender.

== Career ==
=== College and amateur ===
McCrary played four years of college soccer at the University of North Carolina at Chapel Hill between 2011 and 2015, including a red-shirted year in 2014 due to a torn ACL. While at college, McCrary appeared for Premier Development League side Reading United A.C. in 2011 and fellow Premier Development League side Carolina Dynamo in 2014 and 2015.

=== Professional ===
On January 14, 2016, McCrary was drafted 10th overall in the 2016 MLS SuperDraft by New England Revolution. McCrary made his professional debut while on loan to New England's United Soccer League affiliate Rochester Rhinos, appearing in a 0–1 loss to Richmond Kickers on April 9, 2016.

McCrary was released by New England at the end of their 2016 season. On March 9, 2017, McCrary signed with USL side Toronto FC II. On February 13, 2018, McCrary signed with MLS club Seattle Sounders FC.

On February 26, 2019, McCrary was released by Seattle ahead of their 2019 season.

On March 22, 2019, McCrary joined USL Championship side Sacramento Republic FC. On November 17, 2020, Sacramento exercised the option on McCrary's contract, retaining him for the 2021 season. McCrary was released by Sacramento following the 2021 season.
