= Gianluca Catalano =

Canadian soccer player (born 2000)

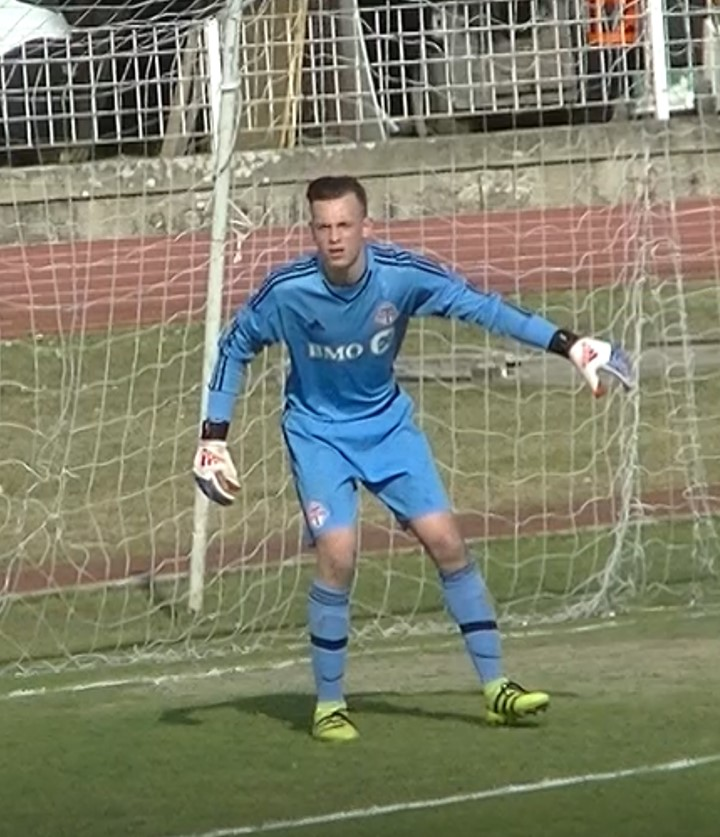
- Catalano with Toronto FC III in 2017

Personal information
- Date of birth: May 6, 2000 (age 26)
- Place of birth: Toronto, Ontario, Canada
- Height: 6 ft 1 in (1.85 m)
- Position: Goalkeeper

Youth career
- Kleinburg Noble ton SC
- 2012–2018: Toronto FC

College career
| Years | Team | Apps | (Gls) |
| 2018–2021 | Connecticut Huskies | 19 | (0) |

Senior career*
| Years | Team | Apps | (Gls) |
| 2016–2018 | Toronto FC III | 28 | (0) |
| 2018 | Toronto FC II | 5 | (0) |
| 2019 | AC Connecticut | 9 | (0) |
| 2022–2023 | Vaughan Azzurri | 12 | (0) |
| 2022 | → York United (loan) | 1 | (0) |
| 2023 | Toronto FC II | 4 | (0) |

International career^{‡}
| 2017 | Canada U17 | 3 | (0) |
- * Club domestic league appearances and goals as of September 1, 2023 ‡ National team caps and goals as of May 25, 2018

Gianluca Catalano (born May 6, 2000) is a Canadian professional soccer player who plays as a goalkeeper.

== Early life ==
Catalano began playing soccer at age three with Kleinburg Nobleton SC. As a youth, he was a member of the TFC Academy. He represented Toronto FC at multiple youth international soccer tournaments in France, Mexico, US, and at the world-famous Torneo di Viareggio in Italy, where he helped the TFC Academy to a 1–1 draw against the Juventus Academy. He later helped them defeat Juventus saving the final shot in a penalty shootout in the championship finals to win the 2017 International Youth Soccer Cup.

== College career ==
In 2018, he accepted a scholarship to play for NCAA Division 1 University of Connecticut (UConn). As a freshman, he started the season opener and won 2-1 vs Lehigh, advanced to the American Athletic Conference semi-finals, and lost to Indiana University in the 2nd round of the NCAA Division I Men's Soccer Tournament, also known as the College Cup. As a sophomore in 2019, he was named Goalkeeper of the Week in October. On February 24, 2020, he was named to the FTF NCAA All-Canadian 1st Team.

== Club career ==
He began his career in the semi-professional League1 Ontario playing for Toronto FC III and was selected to the 2017 League1 Ontario All-Star team.

He made his fully professional league debut for Toronto FC II in the USL Championship as an academy call-up, on May 16, 2018, against Atlanta United 2. He went on to play a total of 5 USL Championship games, including 4 starts, prior to joining UConn.

In the spring of 2019, he joined AC Connecticut of the USL League Two (USL2) making 66 saves in 9 games and was named the number two goalkeeping prospect as part of the league's Top 20 Under 20. On November 20, 2019, he was nominated by the league for the 'Global Greats Series': Best Player from North America 2019, where he finished 3rd overall in voting.

In 2022, he played for Vaughan Azzurri in League1 Ontario. With the Azzurri, he helped them win League1 Premier Division regular season Championship as well as winning the final which also qualified the team to the 2023 Canadian Championship. He also went on trial with Canadian Premier League club York United FC, ahead of the 2022 season. He served as an emergency substitute goalkeeper for York United during the season, and made a start for the club on July 1 against FC Edmonton.

In June 2023, he signed a short-term contract with Toronto FC II in MLS Next Pro, with the team retaining options to extend the contract for the remainder of the 2023 season, as well as the 2024 season.

== International career ==
In October 2014, he made his debut in the Canadian youth program at an identification camp for the Canada U15 team. In 2015, he was named to the Canadian U-15 team, for a CONCACAF tournament in Mexico City. Later that same year, he was named to a U-18 development camp. In 2017, he was named to the Canadian U17 team for the 2017 CONCACAF U-17 Championship.

== Career statistics ==
As of September 1, 2023

| Club | League | Season | League | | Playoffs | | Domestic Cup | | League Cup | | Total | |
| Club | League | Season | Apps | Goals | Apps | Goals | Apps | Goals | Apps | Goals | Apps | Goals |
|---|---|---|---|---|---|---|---|---|---|---|---|---|
| Toronto FC III | League1 Ontario | 2016 | 9 | 0 | — | | — | | ? | 0 | 9 | 0 |
| Toronto FC III | League1 Ontario | 2017 | 17 | 0 | — | | — | | ? | 0 | 17 | 0 |
| Toronto FC III | League1 Ontario | 2018 | 2 | 0 | — | | — | | 1 | 0 | 3 | 0 |
| Toronto FC III | Total | | 28 | 0 | — | — | — | — | 1 | 0 | 29 | 0 |
| Toronto FC II | USL | 2018 | 5 | 0 | — | | — | | — | | 5 | 0 |
| AC Connecticut | USL League Two | 2019 | 9 | 0 | — | | — | | — | | 9 | 0 |
| Vaughan Azzurri | League1 Ontario | 2022 | 8 | 0 | 2 | 0 | — | | — | | 10 | 0 |
| Vaughan Azzurri | League1 Ontario | 2023 | 4 | 0 | 0 | 0 | 1 | 0 | — | | 5 | 0 |
| Vaughan Azzurri | Total | | 12 | 0 | 2 | 0 | 1 | 0 | 0 | 0 | 15 | 0 |
| York United FC (loan) | Canadian Premier League | 2022 | 1 | 0 | — | | 0 | 0 | — | | 1 | 0 |
| Toronto FC II | MLS Next Pro | 2023 | 4 | 0 | — | | — | | — | | 4 | 0 |
| Career Total | | | 59 | 0 | 2 | 0 | 1 | 0 | 1 | 0 | 63 | 0 |
