= Jelani Peters =

Trinidadian footballer (born 1993)

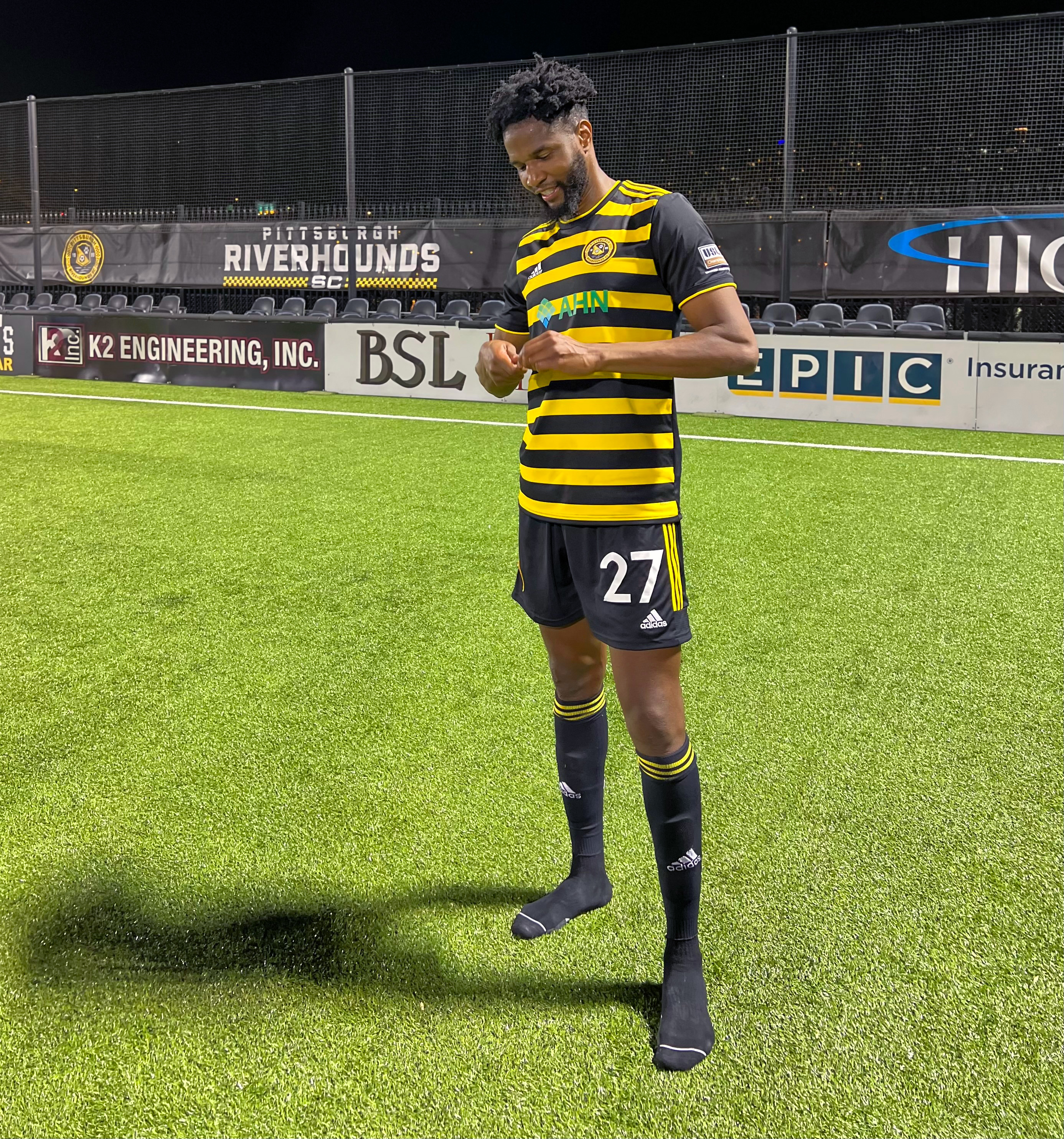
- Peters with the Riverhounds, April 2022

Personal information
- Date of birth: 17 December 1993 (age 32)
- Place of birth: Port of Spain, Trinidad and Tobago
- Height: 1.95 m (6 ft 5 in)
- Position: Defender

Youth career
- Metro Stars
- St. Ann's Rangers
- San Juan Jabloteh

Senior career*
Years	Team	Apps	(Gls)
2013–2016	St. Ann's Rangers		(5)
2016–2017	W Connection	18	(1)
2017	→ Toronto FC II (loan)	2	(0)
2017–2019	Toronto FC II	4	(0)
2021–2022	Pittsburgh Riverhounds	53	(3)
2023	Memphis 901	18	(1)

International career^{‡}
2021–	Trinidad and Tobago	4	(0)
- * Club domestic league appearances and goals as of 10:13, 19 October 2023 (UTC) ‡ National team caps and goals as of 22:14, 15 July 2021 (UTC)

Jelani Peters (born December 17, 1993) is a Trinidadian professional footballer who plays as a defender.

== Playing career ==
=== Club career ===
Peters played 22 matches with W Connection during the 2016–17 season (18 in league, 4 in Champions League) before being loaned out to American second-tier side Toronto FC II in April 2017, after a preseason trial.

He made his league debut with the team on April 7, appearing as a part of the starting XI in a 0–0 draw with the Rochester Rhinos. After another appearance against Ottawa Fury, Toronto FC II signed Peters to a permanent contract on May 19. Later that day, he played against Tampa Bay Rowdies, again in head coach Jason Bent's starting XI.

In April 2021, Peters signed with Pittsburgh Riverhounds after a successful trial.

On 20 January 2023, Peter moved to USL Championship side Memphis 901. He left Memphis following the 2023 season.

=== International career ===
Peters was called up to the Trinidad and Tobago national team in November 2016, and appeared on the bench in 2018 World Cup qualifying games against Costa Rica and Honduras.
