= Øyvind Alseth =

Norwegian footballer (born 1994)

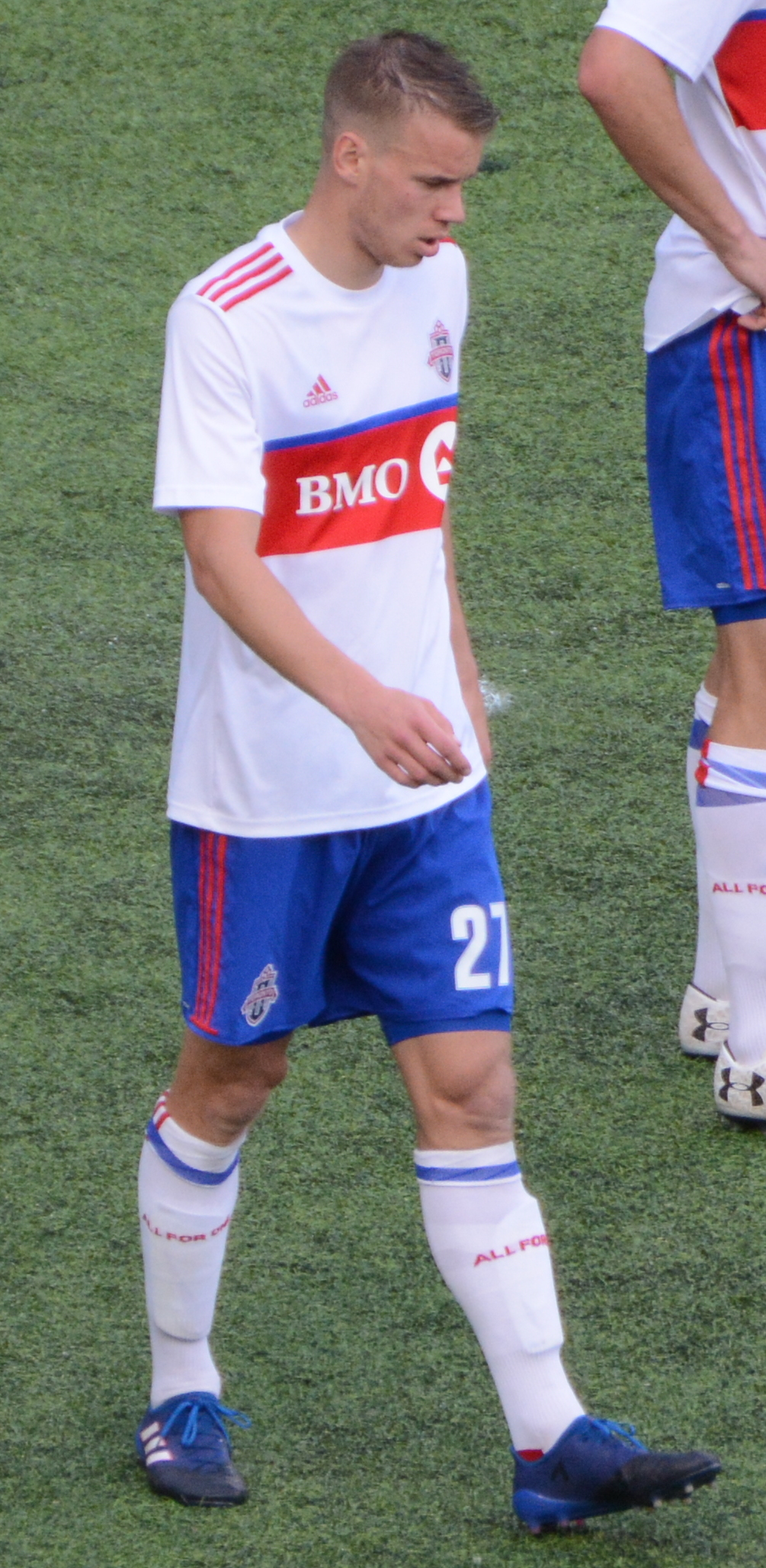
- Alseth playing for Toronto FC II in 2017

Personal information
- Date of birth: 13 August 1994 (age 32)
- Place of birth: Trondheim, Norway
- Height: 1.84 m (6 ft 0 in)
- Positions: Defender; midfielder

Youth career
- –2010: Byåsen
- 2010–2013: Rosenborg

College career
Years	Team	Apps	(Gls)
2013–2016	Syracuse Orange	82	(7)

Senior career*
Years	Team	Apps	(Gls)
2015	K-W United	11	(4)
2017	Toronto FC	4	(0)
2017	→ Toronto FC II (loan)	17	(0)
2018–2021	Ranheim	67	(2)
- * Club domestic league appearances and goals as of 17 July 2021

Øyvind Alseth (born 13 August 1994) is a Norwegian footballer who currently plays as a defender or midfielder.

== Career ==
=== College ===
Alseth played four years of college soccer at the Syracuse University between 2013 and 2016. While at college, Alseth appeared for USL PDL side K-W United.

=== Professional ===
Alseth was selected in the third round (65th overall) of the 2017 MLS SuperDraft by Toronto FC. Alseth signed with Toronto on 22 March 2017.

Alseth made his professional debut on 25 March 2017, starting for Toronto's United Soccer League affiliate team against Phoenix Rising FC.

== Career statistics ==
As of 17 July 2021

Season	Club	Division	League		Cup		Europe		Total	
Season	Club	Division	Apps	Goals	Apps	Goals	Apps	Goals	Apps	Goals
2015	K-W United	PDL	11	4	0	0	0	0	11	4
2017	Toronto FC	MLS	4	0	0	0	0	0	4	0
2017	Toronto FC II	USL	17	0	0	0	0	0	17	0
2018	Ranheim	Eliteserien	15	0	3	0	0	0	18	0
2019	Ranheim	Eliteserien	17	1	4	0	0	0	21	1
2020	Ranheim	OBOS-ligaen	25	1	0	0	0	0	25	1
2021	Ranheim	OBOS-ligaen	10	0	0	0	0	0	10	0
Career Total			99	6	7	0	0	0	106	6
