= Lars Eckenrode =

American soccer player

Personal information
- Full name: Lars Konstantin Eckenrode
- Date of birth: March 24, 1995 (age 31)
- Place of birth: West Springfield, Virginia, United States
- Height: 1.90 m (6 ft 3 in)
- Position: Centerback

Youth career
- 2011–2013: D.C. United

College career
Years	Team	Apps	(Gls)
2013–2016	Michigan Wolverines	68	(1)

Senior career*
Years	Team	Apps	(Gls)
2011	D.C. United Reserves	2	(0)
2014	D.C. United U-23		
2015–2016	AFC Ann Arbor	4	(1)
2017–2018	Toronto FC II	18	(0)
2018	Toronto FC III	3	(0)
2019–2022	South Georgia Tormenta	21	(2)
- * Club domestic league appearances and goals as of January 18, 2023

Lars Konstantin Eckenrode (born March 24, 1995) is an American former professional soccer player.

Eckenrode was named in the Big Ten All-Rookie Team in 2013 at university, and spent his entire career in the USA and Canada.

== Career ==
=== College & Youth ===
Eckenrode grew up in West Springfield, Virginia and played soccer for the West Springfield Spartans. After a decorated club and high school career, he attended the University of Michigan for four years, where he played for the Wolverines. Scoring once in 68 appearances, while also recording 2 assists, he was named to the Big Ten All-Rookie Team in 2013 and College Sports Madness Preseason All-Big Ten Team in 2014.

During his time in college, Eckenrode also spent time with National Premier Soccer League sides D.C. United U-23 and AFC Ann Arbor.

=== Professional ===
Eckenrode was drafted in the fourth round, 83rd overall, in the 2017 MLS SuperDraft by Toronto FC on January 17, 2017. He signed with United Soccer League side Toronto FC II on March 16, 2017. Eckenrode made his professional debut on March 25, 2017, in a 1–0 victory over Phoenix Rising. He missed the majority of the 2017 season as he was rehabbing from an injury. On March 23, 2018, Toronto FC II re-signed Eckenrode.

On December 11, 2018, Eckenrode signed with Tormenta FC of the newly founded USL League One. He scored his first professional goal on April 14, 2019, in a 1–1 draw with Orlando City B.

Eckenrode retired following the 2022 USL League One season and joined the Tormenta front office as Coordinator of Special Projects. Eckenrode left the Tormenta front office in October 2023.
