= Aikim Andrews =

Trinidadian professional footballer

Personal information
- Full name: Aikim Andrews
- Date of birth: 20 June 1996 (age 30)
- Place of birth: Trinidad and Tobago
- Position: Midfielder

Senior career*
Years	Team	Apps	(Gls)
2015–2017	W Connection	25	(0)
2017–2018	Toronto FC III	2	(1)
2017–2018	Toronto FC II	22	(1)

International career^{‡}
2012–2013	Trinidad and Tobago U17	6	(2)
2015	Trinidad and Tobago U20	5	(2)
2015–	Trinidad and Tobago	4	(1)
- * Club domestic league appearances and goals as of April 25, 2018 ‡ National team caps and goals as of 12:22, 3 October 2015

Aikim Andrews (born 20 June 1996) is a Trinidadian professional footballer.

== Career ==
=== Professional ===
Andrews started his career with W Connection F.C. in the TT Pro League. He made 6 appearances with W Connection in the 2015-2016 CONCACAF Champions League.

On April 3, 2017 Andrews signed a professional contract with Toronto FC II of USL.
