= DARBY (magazine) =

Canadian independent print magazine covering soccer culture

- Editor-in-chief: Tagwa Moyo
- Format: Print
- Publisher: Ryan Abrams
- Founder: Tagwa Moyo, Ryan Abrams
- Founded: 2019
- First issue: 2020; 6 years ago
- Country: Canada
- Based in: Toronto, Ontario
- Language: English
- Website: darbymag.com
- ISSN: 2816-3990

DARBY is a Canadian independent print magazine based in Toronto, Ontario, that covers soccer culture through feature writing, photography, player profiles and cultural commentary. Founded in 2019 by photographer and editor Tagwa Moyo and designer and publisher Ryan Abrams, it focuses particularly on Canadian soccer and on communities that receive limited attention in mainstream sports media.

== History ==
=== Founding ===
DARBY was founded in 2019 by Tagwa Moyo, a graduate of the Toronto Metropolitan University (then Ryerson University) School of Journalism who had worked across North American outlets as a photographer and editor. Moyo has said the magazine grew out of a gap he saw in international coverage of Canadian soccer, which he felt focused mainly on Alphonso Davies or top Canadian Premier League matches rather than the sport's wider culture in Canada. Abrams joined as co-founder soon after, overseeing design, production and business operations, while fellow TMU journalism graduate Mitchell Tierney joined early to lead written and editorial content.

DARBY presents itself as an independent print publication and cultural platform focused on underrepresented communities in Canadian football. No Diploma described the magazine as working to highlight Canadian football culture, while the Review of Journalism credited Moyo, its photographer and editor-in-chief, with telling stories from communities overlooked by mainstream soccer coverage. Moyo has said the magazine prioritizes community-based storytelling and human-centred narratives over conventional results-driven coverage.

=== Publications ===
DARBY's first publication was a zero issue, At Long Last, released in December 2020. It featured Liam Fraser on its cover and included articles on Nichelle Prince, Magnet Freestyle and Oromia FC. Its first numbered issue, On the Rise, followed in 2021. Produced during the COVID-19 pandemic, the issue was affected by restrictions that required changes to planned stories and visual material; its pre-sales exceeded the team's expectations.

The second issue, Legacy, profiled Canadian players and cultural figures, including Atiba Hutchinson, Julia Grosso, Doneil Henry, Justin Morrow, TOBi, Amandine Pierre-Louis and Pa-Modou Kah. The following issue, The Takeover, was published in 2022 and had dual covers featuring Jonathan Osorio of Toronto FC and Janine Beckie of the Portland Thorns. It also featured Kamal Miller, the York Lions and Toronto-based club Regent Park United.

The following issue, Family, released in 2024, centred on family as a theme and included cover stories on Stephen Eustáquio, focusing on his football journey, family and fatherhood, and on Olivia Smith, whose rise in the women's game is framed through her family background. Subsequently, the issue was recognised at the 2025 National Magazine Awards, where DARBY received an Honourable Mention in the Best Magazine: Special Interest category. The jury described the magazine as offering “a bold visual experience with captivating photography and striking design,” with “community‑oriented stories at the intersection of football, identity, and culture” and art direction that “reflects the passion of everyone involved”.

Belief, DARBY's fifth issue, was published in 2025. It featured profiles of Jessie Fleming, Jacob Shaffelburg, Dayne St. Clair, Diana Matheson, Demitrius Omphroy, Cavalry FC, Freda Ayisi and Terry Felix, as well as articles on Soccability Canada, TKOP Academy and the NL Cup.

Issue 6, Home, was released in 2026 ahead of the 2026 FIFA World Cup. It featured Canada international Richie Laryea on one cover.

== Platform and projects ==
Alongside its print run, DARBY has developed a newsletter, podcast and a programme of community events and brand partnerships, including collaborations with Nike. The magazine's founders told No Diploma in 2022 that they viewed DARBY as “a cultural platform” as well as a publication, using events and partnerships to build a community around Canadian football culture.

In 2022, DARBY co‑produced the short documentary Ferryside Darby: A Canadian Soccer Story with OneSoccer. The film covers Pacific FC’s 4–3 victory over Vancouver Whitecaps FC in the 2021 Canadian Championship and the origins of the so‑called Ferryside Derby, and was released on YouTube.

== Reception ==
In 2023, the Review of Journalism discussed DARBY in an article on racial representation in Canadian soccer media. The article quoted founder Tagwa Moyo on his experience as one of the few Black people in professional media settings and situated the magazine within efforts to broaden representation in coverage of Canadian soccer.

In 2026, CBC News mentioned DARBY in an article about the mobility and working conditions of Canadian media workers, describing it as a soccer-culture publication exploring alternative financial models amid newsroom cutbacks.

== Issues ==
Issue	Title	Year
–	At Long Last	2020
1	On the Rise	2021
2	Legacy	2022
3	The Takeover	2022
4	Family	2024
5	Belief	2025
6	Home	2026

== Current editors ==
- Martin Bauman
- Jason Gisoo Kim
- Ararsa Kitaba
- Hanin Mazri
- Ketsia N’Kumbu
- Juan Ramos-Charry
- Mitchell Tierney

== Awards and recognition ==
Year	Award	Category	Result
2025	National Magazine Awards	Best Magazine: Special Interest	Honourable Mention
