= 2015 Toronto FC season =

Toronto FC 2015 soccer season

Toronto FC
2015 season
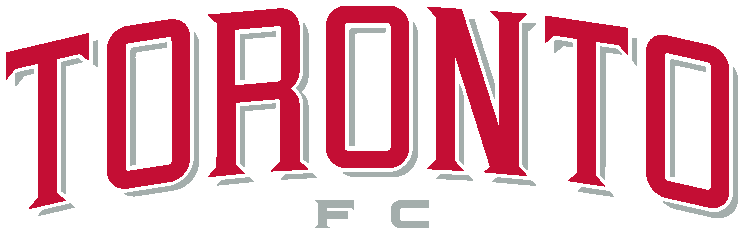
- General manager: Tim Bezbatchenko
- Head coach: Greg Vanney
- Stadium: BMO Field
- Major League Soccer: Conference: 6th Overall: 12th
- MLS Cup playoffs: Knockout round
- Canadian Championship: Semi-finals
- Top goalscorer: League: Sebastian Giovinco (22); All: Sebastian Giovinco (23)
- Highest home attendance: 30,266 (August 29 vs. Montreal Impact)
- Lowest home attendance: 16,382 (June 27 vs. D.C. United)
- Average home league attendance: League: 23,451; All: 23,319
Home colours	Away colours

The 2015 Toronto FC season was the ninth season in the history of Toronto FC.

On October 14, Toronto qualified for the MLS Cup playoffs for the first time in franchise history. The club began the season with a seven match road trip due to ongoing renovations at BMO Field. Their first home game was played May 10 against the Houston Dynamo, more than two months into the season.

== Background ==
During the 2014 season, Toronto FC finished seventh out of ten teams in the Eastern Conference.

On 12 July 2015, Giovinco achieved Toronto FC's first ever hat-trick in MLS play against New York City FC in a 4–4 draw at Yankee Stadium, and set up the fourth goal during the match, also missing a penalty. It was also the third fastest hat trick scored in the league's history at 9 minutes. Following the match, he received the player of the week award for the third time in the 2015 MLS season.

== Squad ==
As of the end of the season.

No.	Player	Nationality	Position	Date of birth (age at year end)	Previous club
Goalkeepers
1	Chris Konopka	(United States)	GK	April 14, 1985 (aged 30)	(United States) Philadelphia Union
12	Joe Bendik	(United States)	GK	April 25, 1989 (aged 26)	(United States) Portland Timbers
25	Alex Bono	(United States)	GK	April 25, 1994 (aged 21)	(United States) Syracuse Orange
40	Quillan Roberts	(Canada)	GK	September 13, 1994 (aged 21)	(Canada) TFC Academy
Defenders
2	Justin Morrow	(United States)	FB	October 4, 1987 (aged 28)	(United States) San Jose Earthquakes
5	Ashtone Morgan	(Canada)	FB	February 9, 1991 (aged 24)	(Canada) TFC Academy
6	Nick Hagglund	(United States)	CB	September 14, 1992 (aged 23)	(United States) Xavier Musketeers
15	Eriq Zavaleta	(United States)	CB	August 2, 1992 (aged 23)	(United States) Seattle Sounders FC
23	Josh Williams	(United States)	CB	April 18, 1988 (aged 27)	(United States) New York City FC
24	Damien Perquis	(Poland)	CB	April 10, 1984 (aged 31)	(Spain) Real Betis
28	Mark Bloom	(United States)	FB	November 25, 1987 (aged 28)	(United States) Atlanta Silverbacks
38	Clément Simonin	(France)	CB	July 1, 1991 (aged 24)	(United States) NC State Wolfpack
41	Ahmed Kantari	(Morocco)	CB	June 28, 1985 (aged 30)	(France) Lens
Midfielders
4	Michael Bradley	(United States)	CM	July 31, 1987 (aged 28)	(Italy) Roma
8	Benoît Cheyrou	(France)	CM	May 3, 1981 (aged 34)	(France) Marseille
11	Jackson	(Brazil)	RW	June 3, 1988 (aged 27)	(United States) FC Dallas
14	Jay Chapman	(Canada)	AM	January 1, 1994 (aged 21)	(Canada) K-W United FC
18	Marky Delgado	(United States)	CM	May 16, 1995 (aged 20)	(United States) Chivas USA
19	Daniel Lovitz	(United States)	LW	August 27, 1991 (aged 24)	(United States) Elon Phoenix
20	Chris Mannella	(Canada)	DM	June 7, 1994 (aged 21)	(Canada) TFC Academy
21	Jonathan Osorio	(Canada)	AM	June 12, 1992 (aged 23)	(Canada) SC Toronto
26	Collen Warner	(United States)	DM	June 24, 1988 (aged 27)	(Canada) Montreal Impact
34	Manny Aparicio	(Canada)	CM	September 17, 1995 (aged 20)	(Canada) TFC Academy
Forwards
10	Sebastian Giovinco	(Italy)	ST	January 26, 1987 (aged 28)	(Italy) Juventus
16	Herculez Gomez	(United States)	CF	April 6, 1982 (aged 33)	(Mexico) Tijuana
17	Jozy Altidore	(United States)	CF	November 6, 1989 (aged 26)	(England) Sunderland
22	Jordan Hamilton	(Canada)	ST	March 17, 1996 (aged 19)	(Canada) TFC Academy
27	Luke Moore	(England)	ST	February 13, 1986 (aged 29)	(United States) Chivas USA
55	Robbie Findley	(United States)	CF	August 4, 1985 (aged 30)	(United States) Real Salt Lake

== Transfers ==
=== In ===
No.	Pos.	Player	Transferred from	Fee/notes	Date	Source
18	MF	(United States) Marky Delgado	(United States) Chivas USA	Selected in the 2014 MLS Dispersal Draft	November 19, 2014	
55	FW	(United States) Robbie Findley	(United States) Real Salt Lake	Selected in the 2014 MLS Re-Entry Draft	December 12, 2014	
25	GK	(United States) Alex Bono	(United States) Syracuse Orange	Selected in the 2015 MLS SuperDraft	January 15, 2015	
17	FW	(United States) Jozy Altidore	(England) Sunderland	Swap for Jermain Defoe	January 15, 2015	
14	MF	(Canada) Jay Chapman	(Canada) TFC Academy	Promoted to the first team	January 15, 2015	
15	DF	(United States) Eriq Zavaleta	(United States) Seattle Sounders FC	Acquired for 2016 MLS SuperDraft 2nd Round Pick	January 26, 2015	
24	DF	(Poland) Damien Perquis	(Spain) Real Betis	Free	January 26, 2015	
8	MF	(France) Benoît Cheyrou	(France) Marseille	Free	January 29, 2015	
10	FW	(Italy) Sebastian Giovinco	(Italy) Juventus	Free	February 2, 2015	
38	DF	(France) Clément Simonin	(United States) NC State Wolfpack	Selected in the 2015 MLS SuperDraft	March 27, 2015	
41	DF	(Morocco) Ahmed Kantari	(France) Lens	Free Transfer	July 24, 2015	
23	DF	(United States) Josh Williams	(United States) New York City FC	Claimed off waivers	July 31, 2015	
16	FW	(United States) Hérculez Gómez	(Mexico) Tijuana	Acquired the right of first refusal from Sporting Kansas City in exchange for allocation money	August 7, 2015	

==== Draft picks ====
Draft picks are not automatically signed to the team roster. Only those who are signed to a contract will be listed as transfers in. Only trades involving draft picks and executed after the start of 2015 MLS SuperDraft will be listed in the notes.

No.	Pos.	Player	Previous club	Notes	Date	Source
25	GK	(United States) Alex Bono	(United States) Syracuse Orange	MLS SuperDraft 1st Round Pick (#6)	January 15, 2015	
38	DF	(France) Clément Simonin	(United States) NC State Wolfpack	MLS SuperDraft 1st Round Pick (#9)	January 15, 2015	
	DF	(Canada) Skylar Thomas	(United States) Syracuse Orange	MLS SuperDraft 1st Round Pick (#11)	January 15, 2015	
	DF	(United States) Wesley Charpie	(United States) South Florida Bulls	MLS SuperDraft 2nd Round Pick (#29)	January 15, 2015	
	FW	(United States) Edwin Rivas	(United States) Cal State Northridge Matadors	MLS SuperDraft 2nd Round Pick (#37)	January 15, 2015	
	FW	(United States) Mike Ramos	(United States) Whitworth Pirates	MLS SuperDraft 3rd Round Pick (#50)	January 20, 2015	
	FW	(Mexico) Sal Bernal	(United States) UNLV Rebels	MLS SuperDraft 4th Round Pick (#70)	January 20, 2015	
	FW	(United States) Tyler Engel	(United States) North Carolina Tar Heels	MLS SuperDraft 4th Round Pick (#81)	January 20, 2015	

=== Out ===
No.	Pos.	Player	Transferred to	Fee/notes	Date	Source
25	MF	(United States) Jeremy Hall	(United States) New England Revolution	Traded for a 2015 MLS SuperDraft 4th round pick	December 12, 2015	
18	FW	(England) Jermain Defoe	(England) Sunderland	Swap for Jozy Altidore	January 15, 2015	
32	FW	(United States) Andrew Wiedeman	(Canada) Ottawa Fury	Free transfer	January 26, 2015	
4	MF	(Canada) Kyle Bekker	(United States) FC Dallas	Traded for Allocation Money	January 26, 2015	
7	FW	(Ghana) Dominic Oduro	(Canada) Montreal Impact	Traded for Allocation Money	January 27, 2015	
16	DF	(England) Bradley Orr	(England) Blackburn Rovers	Loan Expired	January 1, 2015	
25	DF	(Canada) Doneil Henry	(England) West Ham United	Loan Expired	January 1, 2015	
2	DF	(United States) Ryan Richter	(Canada) Ottawa Fury	Contract Expired	January 28, 2015	
14	MF	(Canada) Dwayne De Rosario		Retired	January 30, 2015	
13	DF	(Scotland) Steven Caldwell		Retired	July 14, 2015	
9	FW	(Brazil) Gilberto	(United States) Chicago Fire	Claimed off waivers	July 27, 2015	
7	FW	(Nigeria) Bright Dike	(Russia) Amkar Perm	Waived	August 4, 2015	
3	DF	(United States) Warren Creavalle	(United States) Philadelphia Union	Traded for 2016 MLS SuperDraft 2nd Round Pick	August 7, 2015	

=== Loan out ===
No.	Pos.	Player	Transferred to	Fee/notes	Date	Source
9	FW	(Brazil) Gilberto	(Brazil) Vasco da Gama	Recalled July 27, 2015	February 20, 2015	
7	FW	(Nigeria) Bright Dike	(United States) San Antonio Scorpions	Recalled July 1, 2015	April 27, 2015	

== Competitions ==
=== Preseason ===
February 3 Scrimmage	Montverde Eagles	2–4	Toronto FC	Orlando, Florida
3:30PM	83'	Report	Findley 10'; Hamilton 73', 87'; Ramos 90'
Note: Three 30 minute periods.

February 5 Scrimmage	Eastern Florida Titans	0–1	Toronto FC	Davenport, Florida
4:00PM				Stadium: ChampionsGate Sports Complex

February 8 Scrimmage	Orlando City SC	0–0	Toronto FC	Davenport, Florida
		Report		Stadium: ChampionsGate Sports Complex

February 18 IMG Suncoast Pro Classic	Oklahoma City Energy FC	1–0	Toronto FC	Bradenton, Florida
7:30PM	Greig 50'; Evans (yellow card) 52'	Report	Morgan (yellow card) 67'	Stadium: IMG Academy

February 21 IMG Suncoast Pro Classic	Toronto FC	1–0	HB Køge	Bradenton, Florida
12:00PM	Morrow (yellow card) 25'; Osorio 53'; Creavalle (yellow card) 66'	Report	Brandão (yellow card) 40'; Bruninho (yellow card) 54'	Stadium: IMG Academy

February 25 IMG Suncoast Pro Classic	New York Red Bulls	2–0	Toronto FC	Bradenton, Florida
7:30PM	Wright-Phillips 23'; Zizzo 47'			Stadium: IMG Academy

February 28 IMG Suncoast Pro Classic Placement Match	Toronto FC	2–1	Costa Rica U-23	Bradenton, Florida
	Giovinco; Altidore			Stadium: IMG Academy

=== Major League Soccer ===
==== League tables ====
===== Eastern Conference =====
Pos	Team	Pld	W	L	T	GF	GA	GD	Pts	Qualification
4	D.C. United	34	15	13	6	43	45	−2	51	Qualification for the knockout round
5	New England Revolution	34	14	12	8	48	47	+1	50	Qualification for the knockout round
6	Toronto FC	34	15	15	4	58	58	0	49	Qualification for the knockout round
7	Orlando City SC	34	12	14	8	46	56	−10	44	
8	New York City FC	34	10	17	7	49	58	−9	37	

Source: MLS

===== Overall =====
Pos	Team	Pld	W	L	T	GF	GA	GD	Pts	
10	Sporting Kansas City (U)	34	14	11	9	48	45	+3	51	Qualification for the CONCACAF Champions League
11	New England Revolution	34	14	12	8	48	47	+1	50	
12	Toronto FC	34	15	15	4	58	58	0	49	
13	San Jose Earthquakes	34	13	13	8	41	39	+2	47	
14	Orlando City SC	34	12	14	8	46	56	−10	44	

Source: MLS
Rules for classification: 1) points; 2) total wins; 3) total goal differential; 4) total goals scored
(U) U.S. Open Cup winners

==== Results summary ====
Overall								Home						Away					
Pld	W	D	L	GF	GA	GD	Pts	W	D	L	GF	GA	GD	W	D	L	GF	GA	GD
34	15	4	15	58	58	0	49	11	1	5	34	22	+12	4	3	10	24	36	−12

Last updated: October 25, 2015.
Source: MLS

==== Results by round ====
Round	1	2	3	4	5	6	7	8	9	10	11	12	13	14	15	16	17	18	19	20	21	22	23	24	25	26	27	28	29	30	31	32	33	34
Ground	A	A	A	A	A	A	A	H	A	H	H	A	H	H	H	A	A	H	A	A	H	H	A	H	H	A	H	A	H	H	H	H	H	A
Result	W	L	L	L	L	W	W	L	D	W	W	W	L	W	D	L	D	W	D	L	W	L	L	W	W	L	L	L	W	W	W	W	L	L

Updated to match(es) played on October 25, 2015. Source: Regular season matches
A = Away; H = Home; W = Win; D = Draw; L = Loss

==== Matches ====
March 7	Vancouver Whitecaps FC	1–3	Toronto FC	Vancouver, British Columbia
6:00PM	Rivero 19'; Koffie (yellow card) 77'; Kah (yellow card) 89'	Report	Altidore 32', 90' (pen.); Findley 59'; Creavalle (yellow card) 78'	Stadium: BC Place; Attendance: 21,000; Referee: Kevin Stott

March 14	Columbus Crew SC	2–0	Toronto FC	Columbus, Ohio
7:30PM	Meram 57'; Kamara 61'; George (yellow card) 85'	Report	Morrow (red card) 45+1'	Stadium: Mapfre Stadium; Attendance: 15,826; Referee: David Gantar

March 29	Real Salt Lake	2–1	Toronto FC	Sandy, Utah
7:00PM	Mulholland 38', (yellow card) 39'; Allen 89'	Report	Moore (yellow card) 20'; Warner (yellow card) 60'; Simonin (yellow card) 67'; Jackson 88'	Stadium: Rio Tinto Stadium; Attendance: 20,794; Referee: Hilario Grajeda

April 4	Chicago Fire	3–2	Toronto FC	Bridgeview, Illinois
3:00PM	Jones 14'; Adaílton (yellow card) 32'; Maloney 56'; Larentowicz 68'; Gehrig (yellow card) 73'	Report	Creavalle (yellow card) 5' (yellow-red card) 67'; Giovinco 20'; Cheyrou 54'; Morrow (yellow card) 90'	Stadium: Toyota Park; Attendance: 13,818; Referee: Juan Guzman

April 18	FC Dallas	3–2	Toronto FC	Frisco, Texas
8:30PM	Castillo 1', 10'; Pérez 27'	Report	Bradley (yellow card) 70'; Hagglund (yellow card) 80'; Giovinco 83', 89'; Perquis (yellow card) 90+1'	Stadium: Toyota Stadium; Attendance: 16,176; Referee: Ismail Elfath

April 26	Orlando City SC	0–2	Toronto FC	Orlando, Florida
7:00PM	Shea (yellow card) 45'; Cerén (yellow card) 57'; Molino (yellow card) 68'	Report	Hagglund (yellow card) 2'; Altidore 50', 83'; Osorio (yellow card) 70'	Stadium: Citrus Bowl; Attendance: 30,908; Referee: Jose Carlos Rivero

May 2	Philadelphia Union	0–1	Toronto FC	Chester, Pennsylvania
4:00PM	Gaddis (yellow card) 56'	Report	Giovinco 34'; Hagglund (yellow card) 43'	Stadium: PPL Park; Attendance: 17,859; Referee: Armando Villarreal

May 10	Toronto FC	1–2	Houston Dynamo	Toronto, Ontario
5:00PM	Cheyrou (yellow card) 12'; Altidore 77'	Report	Boniek García (penalty missed) 44', 44'; Bruin 53'; Miranda (yellow card) 90+3'	Stadium: BMO Field; Attendance: 30,226; Referee: Chris Penso

May 16	New England Revolution	1–1	Toronto FC	Foxborough, Massachusetts
7:30PM	Agudelo 32'	Report	Bradley 53'; Konopka (yellow card) 80'	Stadium: Gillette Stadium; Attendance: 24,269; Referee: Sorin Stoica

May 23	Toronto FC	1–0	Portland Timbers	Toronto, Ontario
5:00PM	Giovinco 5'; Morgan (yellow card) 90'	Report	Chará (yellow card) 90+2'	Stadium: BMO Field; Attendance: 23,569; Referee: Jorge Gonzalez

May 30	Toronto FC	3–1	San Jose Earthquakes	Toronto, Ontario
5:00PM	Morrow 22'; Creavalle 33'; Moore 71'	Report	Wondolowski 24' (pen.); Nyassi (yellow card) 55'	Stadium: BMO Field; Attendance: 17,711; Referee: Fotis Bazakos

June 6	D.C. United	1–2	Toronto FC	Washington, D.C.
7:00PM	Birnbaum 6'; Kitchen (yellow card) 64'; Birnbaum (yellow card) 87'	Report	Giovinco 34', 83'; Creavalle (yellow card) 64'; Perquis (yellow card) 64'; Konopka (yellow card) 90+3'	Stadium: RFK Stadium; Attendance: 17,105; Referee: Jair Marrufo

June 20	Toronto FC	0–2	New York City FC	Toronto, Ontario
7:00PM	Giovinco (yellow card) 20'; Morgan (yellow card) 45+1'; Altidore (yellow card) 87'	Report	Villa 8' (pen.), 58'; Wingert (yellow card) 35'; Hernandez (yellow card) 60'; Saunders (yellow card) 66'; Poku (yellow card) 82'; Facey (yellow card) 84'	Stadium: BMO Field; Attendance: 30,029; Referee: Allen Chapman

June 24	Toronto FC	3–1	Montreal Impact	Toronto, Ontario
8:00PM	Bradley 27'; Altidore 56'; Giovinco 82' (pen.)	Report	Oyongo 19'; Soumaré (yellow card) 20'; Ciman (yellow card) 70'	Stadium: BMO Field; Attendance: 24,895; Referee: Alan Kelly

June 27	Toronto FC	0–0	D.C. United	Toronto, Ontario
5:00PM	Warner (yellow card) 53'	Report	Korb (yellow card) 54'; Aguilar (yellow card) 61'; Coria (yellow card) 89'; Arnaud (yellow card) 90+1'	Stadium: BMO Field; Attendance: 16,382; Referee: Armando Villarreal

July 4	Los Angeles Galaxy	4–0	Toronto FC	Carson, California
10:30PM	Keane 9' (pen.), 41', 59'; Villarreal (yellow card) 54'; Husidić (yellow card) 58'; DeLaGarza (yellow card) 80'; Lletget 90+4'	Report	Zavaleta (yellow card) 60'; Delgado (yellow card) 68'; Warner (yellow card) 85'	Stadium: StubHub Center; Attendance: 27,000; Referee: Chris Penso

July 12	New York City FC	4–4	Toronto FC	New York, New York
3:00PM	Villa 17', 65' (pen.), (penalty missed) 29'; Perquis 29' (o.g.); Iraola (yellow card) 60'; Ballouchy (yellow card) 66'; Mullins 84'	Report	Giovinco (penalty missed) 19', 34' (pen.), 40', 43'; Hagglund (yellow card) 26'; Warner (yellow card) 62'; Delgado 82'; Morrow (yellow card) 90+3'	Stadium: Yankee Stadium; Attendance: 27,533; Referee: Ted Unkel

July 18	Toronto FC	2–1	Philadelphia Union	Toronto, Ontario
4:00PM	Delgado 29'; Giovinco 32'	Report	Casey 90+1'	Stadium: BMO Field; Attendance: 25,032; Referee: Jorge Gonzalez

July 25	Columbus Crew SC	3–3	Toronto FC	Columbus, Ohio
7:30PM	Kamara 17', (yellow card) 69'; Tchani 36'; Finlay 47'; Francis (yellow card) 88'	Report	Perquis (yellow card) 20'; Giovinco 50', (yellow card) 85'; Warner 55', (yellow card) 76'; Altidore 89' (pen.)	Stadium: Mapfre Stadium; Attendance: 21,324; Referee: Fotis Bazakos

August 1	New England Revolution	3–1	Toronto FC	Foxborough, Massachusetts
7:30PM	Gonçalves (yellow card) 30'; Davies 35', 62'; Nguyen 44' (pen.)	Report	Findley (yellow card) 34'; Altidore (red card) 39'; Kantari (yellow card) 48'; Bendik (yellow card) 60'; Perquis (yellow card) 61'; Osorio 75'	Stadium: Gillette Stadium; Attendance: 21,362; Referee: Chris Penso

August 5	Toronto FC	4–1	Orlando City SC	Toronto, Ontario
8:00PM	Giovinco 12' (pen.), 56', 88'; Perquis (yellow card) 46'; Cheyrou (yellow card) 75'; Warner 81'	Report	Hines (yellow card) 8'; Boden 17'; Cerén (yellow card) 55'; Carrasco (yellow card) 75'	Stadium: BMO Field; Attendance: 26,648; Referee: Silviu Petrescu

August 8	Toronto FC	1–3	Sporting Kansas City	Toronto, Ontario
4:00PM	Bradley 22'; Warner (yellow card) 88'	Report	Feilhaber 22' (pen.); Németh 29'; Peterson 87'	Stadium: BMO Field; Attendance: 24,326; Referee: Mark Geiger

August 15	New York Red Bulls	3–0	Toronto FC	Harrison, New Jersey
7:30PM	Wright-Phillips 27'; McCarty (yellow card) 30'; Sam (yellow card) 60'; Wallace 65'; Lade (yellow card) 78'; Verón 90+3'	Report	Bradley (yellow card) 23'; Altidore (yellow card) 37'	Stadium: Red Bull Arena; Attendance: 20,685; Referee: Baldomero Toledo

August 22	Toronto FC	5–0	Orlando City SC	Toronto, Ontario
4:00PM	Giovinco (yellow card) 23', (goal) 57'; Kantari (yellow card) 42'; Delgado 46'; Morrow 71'; Altidore 83' (pen.) 85'	Report	Carrasco (yellow card) 30'; Ramos (red card) 36'; Kaká (yellow card) 39'; Winter (yellow card) 56' (yellow-red card) 82'; Higuita (yellow card) 84'	Stadium: BMO Field; Attendance: 26,397; Referee: Jose Carlos Rivero

August 29	Toronto FC	2–1	Montreal Impact	Toronto, Ontario
4:00PM	Warner (yellow card) 24'; Bradley 35'; Altidore 55'	Report	Ciman (yellow card) 45+2' (yellow-red card) 77'; Oduro 77', (yellow card) 90+4'; Cabrera (yellow card) 56'	Stadium: BMO Field; Attendance: 30,266; Referee: Armando Villarreal

September 5	Seattle Sounders FC	2–1	Toronto FC	Seattle, Washington
10:00PM	Martins 6'; Scott (yellow card) 19'; Alonso (yellow card) 30'; Dempsey 77'	Report	Zavaleta 59'; Delgado (yellow card) 68'	Stadium: CenturyLink Field; Attendance: 39,960; Referee: Ted Unkel

September 13	Toronto FC	1–3	New England Revolution	Toronto, Ontario
5:00PM	Findley (yellow card) 51', (goal) 55'; Kantari (yellow card) 74'	Report	Perquis 4' (o.g.); Jones (yellow card) 27'; Fagúndez 39'; Farrell (yellow card) 59'; Rowe (yellow card) 63', (goal) 71'	Stadium: BMO Field; Attendance: 20,257; Referee: Baldomero Toledo

September 16	New York City FC	2–0	Toronto FC	New York, New York
7:30PM	Lampard 20'; Hernandez (yellow card) 62'; Mullins 77'; Saunders (yellow card) 88'	Report	Cheyrou (yellow card) 52'; Perquis (yellow card) 90+3'	Stadium: Yankee Stadium; Attendance: 25,075; Referee: Chris Penso

September 19	Toronto FC	3–1	Colorado Rapids	Toronto, Ontario
2:00PM	Giovinco 14', 18'; Perquis 38'; Morrow (yellow card) 45'; Altidore (yellow card) 57'; Moore (yellow card) 73'; Delgado (yellow card) 88'	Report	Figueroa (yellow card) 24'; Powers 40'; Pittinari (yellow card) 61'; Cronin (yellow card) 76'	Stadium: BMO Field; Attendance: 19,692; Referee: Mathieu Bourdeau

September 26	Toronto FC	3–2	Chicago Fire	Toronto, Ontario
2:00PM	Giovinco 29', (yellow card) 69'; Bradley 59'; Altidore 79'	Report	Gilberto 1', 52'	Stadium: BMO Field; Attendance: 22,513; Referee: Ismail Elfath

October 3	Toronto FC	3–1	Philadelphia Union	Toronto, Ontario
5:00PM	Giovinco 28'; Altidore 63'; Marquez 90+1' (o.g.)	Report	Vitória (yellow card) 25', (goal) 66'	Stadium: BMO Field; Attendance: 18,332; Referee: Ricardo Salazar

October 14	Toronto FC	2–1	New York Red Bulls	Toronto, Ontario
7:00PM	Jackson (yellow card) 26'; Altidore (red card) 34'; Gómez 51'; Cheyrou (yellow card) 62'; Giovinco 78'	Report	Lawrence (yellow card) 40'; McCarty (yellow card) 70'; S. Wright-Phillips 86'	Stadium: BMO Field; Attendance: 18,143; Referee: Fotis Bazakos

October 17	Toronto FC	0–2	Columbus Crew SC	Toronto, Ontario
2:00PM	Bradley (yellow card) 42'; Cheyrou (yellow card) 73'	Report	Higuaín (yellow card) 31', (goal) 90+1'; Finlay 40'; Kamara (yellow card) 63'; Sauro (yellow card) 85'; Parkhurst (yellow card) 87'	Stadium: BMO Field; Attendance: 24,253; Referee: Chris Penso

October 25	Montreal Impact	2–1	Toronto FC	Montreal, Quebec
5:00PM	Drogba 54', 55'; Cabrera (yellow card) 90+1'	Report	Jackson (yellow card) 27'; Altidore 45'	Stadium: Saputo Stadium; Attendance: 20,801; Referee: Alan Kelly

=== MLS Cup Playoffs ===
October 29 Knockout round	Montreal Impact	3–0	Toronto FC	Montreal, Quebec
7:00PM	Bernier 18'; Piatti 33'; Drogba 39'	Report	Delgado (yellow card) 87'	Stadium: Saputo Stadium; Attendance: 18,069; Referee: Baldomero Toledo

=== Canadian Championship ===
May 6	Montreal Impact	1–0	Toronto FC	Montreal, Quebec
7:30PM	Lefèvre (yellow card) 30'; McInerney 68'; Bernier (yellow card) 78'	Report		Stadium: Saputo Stadium; Attendance: 12,518; Referee: Silviu Petrescu

May 13	Toronto FC	3–2 (3–3a agg.)	Montreal Impact	Toronto, Ontario
7:30PM	Altidore 22'; Cheyrou 56'; Giovinco 58', (yellow card) 73'	Report	Oduro (yellow card) 16', (goal) 84'; Cooper 25'; Bernier (yellow card) 63'; Kronberg (yellow card) 90+5'	Stadium: BMO Field; Attendance: 21,069; Referee: Mathieu Bourdeau

=== Mid-season friendlies ===
May 27	Toronto FC (Canada)	0–1	(England) Manchester City	Toronto, Ontario
7:00PM		Report	Evans 84'	Stadium: BMO Field; Attendance: 23,169; Referee: Drew Fischer

July 22	Toronto FC (Canada)	1–2	(England) Sunderland	Toronto, Ontario
7:00PM	Lovitz (yellow card) 28'; Osorio 46'	Report	Larsson (yellow card) 28'; Cattermole (yellow card) 58'; Defoe 65', 69'	Stadium: BMO Field; Attendance: 14,025

== Statistics ==
=== Squad and statistics ===
As of October 29, 2015

No.	Pos	Nat	Player	Total		Major League Soccer		MLS Cup Playoffs		Canadian Championship	
No.	Pos	Nat	Player	Apps	Goals	Apps	Goals	Apps	Goals	Apps	Goals
1	GK	(United States) USA	Chris Konopka	24	0	21+0	0	1+0	0	2+0	0
2	DF	(United States) USA	Justin Morrow	35	2	31+1	2	1+0	0	2+0	0
4	MF	(United States) USA	Michael Bradley	28	5	25+0	5	1+0	0	2+0	0
5	DF	(Canada) CAN	Ashtone Morgan	20	0	17+2	0	0+0	0	1+0	0
6	DF	(United States) USA	Nick Hagglund	14	0	8+4	0	0+0	0	1+1	0
8	MF	(France) FRA	Benoît Cheyrou	31	2	28+0	1	1+0	0	1+1	1
10	FW	(Italy) ITA	Sebastian Giovinco	35	23	32+1	22	1+0	0	1+0	1
11	MF	(Brazil) BRA	Jackson	27	1	14+12	1	1+0	0	0+0	0
12	GK	(United States) USA	Joe Bendik	13	0	13+0	0	0+0	0	0+0	0
14	MF	(Canada) CAN	Jay Chapman	11	0	1+9	0	0+0	0	0+1	0
15	DF	(United States) USA	Eriq Zavaleta	21	1	11+7	1	0+1	0	2+0	0
16	FW	(United States) USA	Hérculez Gómez	8	1	2+5	1	0+1	0	0+0	0
17	FW	(United States) USA	Jozy Altidore	27	14	21+4	13	1+0	0	1+0	1
18	MF	(United States) USA	Marky Delgado	22	3	19+1	3	0+1	0	1+0	0
19	MF	(United States) USA	Daniel Lovitz	12	0	3+8	0	0+0	0	1+0	0
20	MF	(Canada) CAN	Chris Mannella	0	0	0+0	0	0+0	0	0+0	0
21	MF	(Canada) CAN	Jonathan Osorio	32	1	26+3	1	1+0	0	2+0	0
22	FW	(Canada) CAN	Jordan Hamilton	2	0	0+2	0	0+0	0	0+0	0
23	DF	(United States) USA	Josh Williams	13	0	12+0	0	1+0	0	0+0	0
24	DF	(Poland) POL	Damien Perquis	26	1	24+1	1	0+0	0	1+0	0
25	GK	(United States) USA	Alex Bono	0	0	0+0	0	0+0	0	0+0	0
26	MF	(United States) USA	Collen Warner	31	2	20+9	2	0+0	0	2+0	0
27	FW	(England) ENG	Luke Moore	17	1	6+9	1	0+0	0	1+1	0
28	DF	(United States) USA	Mark Bloom	0	0	0+0	0	0+0	0	0+0	0
34	MF	(Canada) CAN	Manny Aparicio	0	0	0+0	0	0+0	0	0+0	0
38	DF	(France) FRA	Clément Simonin	2	0	2+0	0	0+0	0	0+0	0
40	GK	(Canada) CAN	Quillan Roberts	0	0	0+0	0	0+0	0	0+0	0
41	DF	(Morocco) MAR	Ahmed Kantari	13	0	10+2	0	1+0	0	0+0	0
55	FW	(United States) USA	Robbie Findley	26	2	18+7	2	1+0	0	0+0	0
Players who appeared for Toronto but left during the season:
3	DF	(United States) USA	Warren Creavalle	16	1	8+6	1	0+0	0	1+1	0
7	FW	(Nigeria) NGR	Bright Dike	2	0	0+2	0	0+0	0	0+0	0
13	DF	(Scotland) SCO	Steven Caldwell	2	0	2+0	0	0+0	0	0+0	0

=== Goals and assists ===
Correct as of October 29, 2015

Goals
Pos.	Playing Pos.	Nation	Name	Major League Soccer	MLS Cup Playoffs	Canadian Championship	Total
1	FW	(Italy)	Sebastian Giovinco	22	–	1	23
2	FW	(United States)	Jozy Altidore	13	–	1	14
3	MF	(United States)	Michael Bradley	5	–	–	5
4	MF	(United States)	Marky Delgado	3	–	–	3
5	MF	(France)	Benoît Cheyrou	1	–	1	2
5	FW	(United States)	Robbie Findley	2	–	–	2
5	DF	(United States)	Justin Morrow	2	–	–	2
5	MF	(United States)	Collen Warner	2	–	–	2
9	DF	(United States)	Warren Creavalle	1	–	–	1
9	FW	(United States)	Hérculez Gómez	1	–	–	1
9	MF	(Brazil)	Jackson	1	–	–	1
9	FW	(England)	Luke Moore	1	–	–	1
9	MF	(Canada)	Jonathan Osorio	1	–	–	1
9	DF	(Poland)	Damien Perquis	1	–	–	1
9	DF	(United States)	Eriq Zavaleta	1	–	–	1
Total				54	–	3	57

Assists
Pos.	Playing Pos.	Nation	Name	Major League Soccer	MLS Cup Playoffs	Canadian Championship	Total
1	FW	(Italy)	Sebastian Giovinco	16	–	1	17
2	MF	(France)	Benoît Cheyrou	7	–	–	7
2	MF	(Canada)	Jonathan Osorio	7	–	–	7
4	MF	(United States)	Michael Bradley	6	–	–	6
5	MF	(United States)	Marky Delgado	3	–	–	3
5	FW	(United States)	Robbie Findley	3	–	–	3
5	FW	(England)	Luke Moore	3	–	–	3
8	FW	(United States)	Jozy Altidore	–	–	2	2
8	DF	(Canada)	Ashtone Morgan	2	–	–	2
8	DF	(United States)	Justin Morrow	2	–	–	2
8	MF	(United States)	Collen Warner	2	–	–	2
12	FW	(Nigeria)	Bright Dike	1	–	–	1
12	DF	(United States)	Nick Hagglund	1	–	–	1
12	MF	(Brazil)	Jackson	1	–	–	1
12	MF	(United States)	Daniel Lovitz	1	–	–	1
12	DF	(Poland)	Damien Perquis	1	–	–	1
Total				56	–	3	59

=== Clean sheets ===
Includes all competitive matches. Correct as of October 29, 2015

R	Pos	Nat	Name	Major League Soccer	MLS Cup Playoffs	Canadian Championship	Total
1	GK	(United States)	Chris Konopka	4	–	–	4
2	GK	(United States)	Joe Bendik	1	–	–	1
			TOTALS	5	–	–	5

=== Disciplinary record ===
Correct as of October 29, 2015

No.	Pos.	Name	MLS		MLS Cup Playoffs		Canadian Championship		Total	
No.	Pos.	Name	Yellow card	Red card	Yellow card	Red card	Yellow card	Red card	Yellow card	Red card
1	GK	(United States) Chris Konopka	2	0	0	0	0	0	2	0
2	DF	(United States) Justin Morrow	3	1	0	0	0	0	3	1
3	DF	(United States) Warren Creavalle	4	1	0	0	0	0	4	1
4	MF	(United States) Michael Bradley	3	0	0	0	0	0	3	0
5	DF	(Canada) Ashtone Morgan	2	0	0	0	0	0	2	0
6	DF	(United States) Nick Hagglund	4	0	0	0	0	0	4	0
8	MF	(France) Benoît Cheyrou	5	0	0	0	0	0	5	0
10	FW	(Italy) Sebastian Giovinco	4	0	0	0	1	0	5	0
11	MF	(Brazil) Jackson	2	0	0	0	0	0	2	0
12	GK	(United States) Joe Bendik	1	0	0	0	0	0	1	0
15	DF	(United States) Eriq Zavaleta	1	0	0	0	0	0	1	0
17	FW	(United States) Jozy Altidore	3	2	0	0	0	0	3	2
18	MF	(United States) Marky Delgado	3	0	1	0	0	0	4	0
21	MF	(Canada) Jonathan Osorio	1	0	0	0	0	0	1	0
24	DF	(Poland) Damien Perquis	6	0	0	0	0	0	6	0
26	MF	(United States) Collen Warner	7	0	0	0	0	0	7	0
27	FW	(England) Luke Moore	2	0	0	0	0	0	2	0
38	DF	(France) Clément Simonin	1	0	0	0	0	0	1	0
41	DF	(Morocco) Ahmed Kantari	3	0	0	0	0	0	3	0
55	FW	(United States) Robbie Findley	2	0	0	0	0	0	2	0
Total			53	4	1	0	1	0	55	4

== Recognition ==
=== MLS Team of the Week ===
Week	Starters	Bench	Opponent	Link
1	(United States) Justin Morrow, (United States) Michael Bradley, (United States) Jozy Altidore, (United States) Greg Vanney		Vancouver Whitecaps FC	
4		(Italy) Sebastian Giovinco	Real Salt Lake	
5	(France) Benoît Cheyrou		Chicago Fire	
7		(Italy) Sebastian Giovinco	FC Dallas	
8	(United States) Jozy Altidore	(Canada) Ashtone Morgan, (Italy) Sebastian Giovinco	Orlando City SC	
9	(Italy) Sebastian Giovinco		Philadelphia Union	
11	(United States) Chris Konopka		New England Revolution	
12	(Italy) Sebastian Giovinco	(France) Benoît Cheyrou	Portland Timbers	
13	(United States) Justin Morrow, (Italy) Sebastian Giovinco	(United States) Eriq Zavaleta	San Jose Earthquakes	
14	(Italy) Sebastian Giovinco		D.C. United	
17		(United States) Michael Bradley, (Italy) Sebastian Giovinco	Montreal Impact, D.C. United	
19	(Italy) Sebastian Giovinco		New York City FC	
20	(Italy) Sebastian Giovinco	(United States) Marky Delgado	Philadelphia Union	
21	(Italy) Sebastian Giovinco		Columbus Crew	
23	(Italy) Sebastian Giovinco		Orlando City SC, Sporting Kansas City	
25	(United States) Michael Bradley		Orlando City SC	
26	(United States) Michael Bradley	(United States) Chris Konopka, (Canada) Jonathan Osorio	Montreal Impact	
29	(Italy) Sebastian Giovinco	(France) Benoît Cheyrou	New York City FC, Colorado Rapids	
30	(Italy) Sebastian Giovinco		Chicago Fire	
31	(Canada) Jonathan Osorio	(Italy) Sebastian Giovinco	Philadelphia Union	
34		(Brazil) Jackson	Montreal Impact	

=== MLS Player of the Week ===
Week	Player	Week's Statline
1	(United States) Jozy Altidore	2 Goals
13	(Italy) Sebastian Giovinco	2 Assists
14	(Italy) Sebastian Giovinco	2 Goals
19	(Italy) Sebastian Giovinco	3 Goals, 1 Assist

=== MLS Goal of the Week ===
Week	Player	Opponent	Ref
23	(Italy) Sebastian Giovinco	Orlando City SC	

=== MLS Player of the Month ===
Month	Player	Month's Statline
July	(Italy) Sebastian Giovinco	5 Goals, 3 Assists
August	(Italy) Sebastian Giovinco	4 Goals, 3 Assists

=== End of Season awards ===
Award	Player
MLS Golden Boot	(Italy) Sebastian Giovinco
Most Assists	(Italy) Sebastian Giovinco
MLS Newcomer of the Year Award	(Italy) Sebastian Giovinco
MLS Best XI	(Italy) Sebastian Giovinco
Most Valuable Player	(Italy) Sebastian Giovinco
