= Ashtone Morgan =

Canadian soccer player (born 1991)

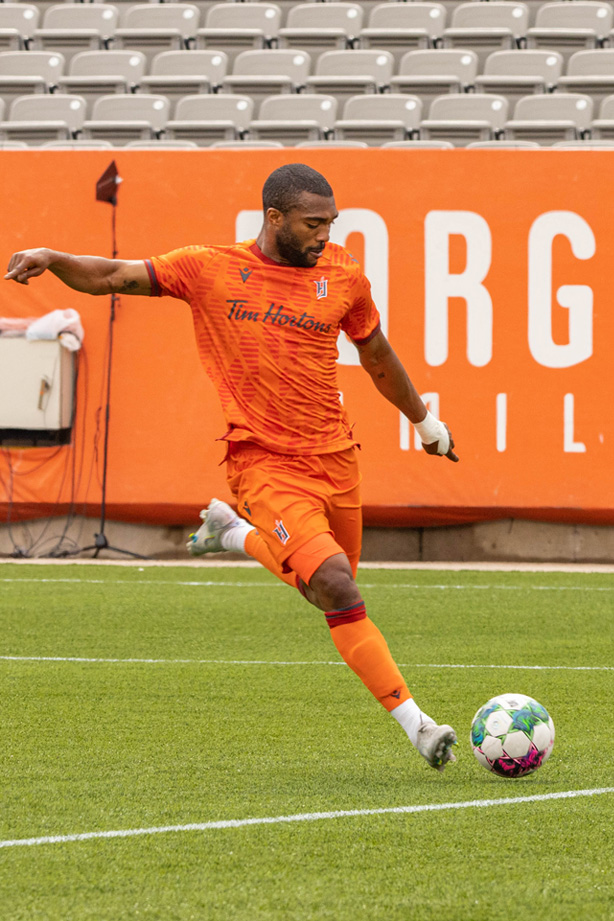
- Morgan scoring a goal for Forge FC in 2022.

Personal information
- Full name: Ashtone Wayne Henry Morgan
- Date of birth: February 9, 1991 (age 35)
- Place of birth: Toronto, Ontario, Canada
- Height: 1.75 m (5 ft 9 in)
- Position: Left-back

Youth career
- West End United
- Toronto Lynx
- 2008–2010: Toronto FC

Senior career*
| Years | Team | Apps | (Gls) |
| 2009–2010 | TFC Academy | | |
| 2011–2019 | Toronto FC | 127 | (2) |
| 2015–2019 | → Toronto FC II (loan) | 11 | (1) |
| 2020–2021 | Real Salt Lake | 8 | (0) |
| 2020–2021 | → Real Monarchs (loan) | 5 | (0) |
| 2022–2023 | Forge FC | 31 | (1) |

International career^{‡}
| 2007 | Canada U16 | | |
| 2010 | Canada U20 | 2 | (0) |
| 2011–2020 | Canada | 18 | (0) |
- * Club domestic league appearances and goals as of July 31, 2023 ‡ National team caps and goals as of January 15, 2020

Ashtone Wayne Henry Morgan (born February 9, 1991) is a Canadian former soccer player who played as a left-back.

Morgan was the first graduate of the TFC Academy to play for the Canada national team.

== Early life ==
Ashtone attended Northern Secondary School in Toronto and played for the Toronto Lynx U-13 squad that travelled to England to play other youth academies. On this trip he was the standout player of the Canadian side earning him invitations from clubs such as Southampton.

== Club career ==
=== Toronto FC ===
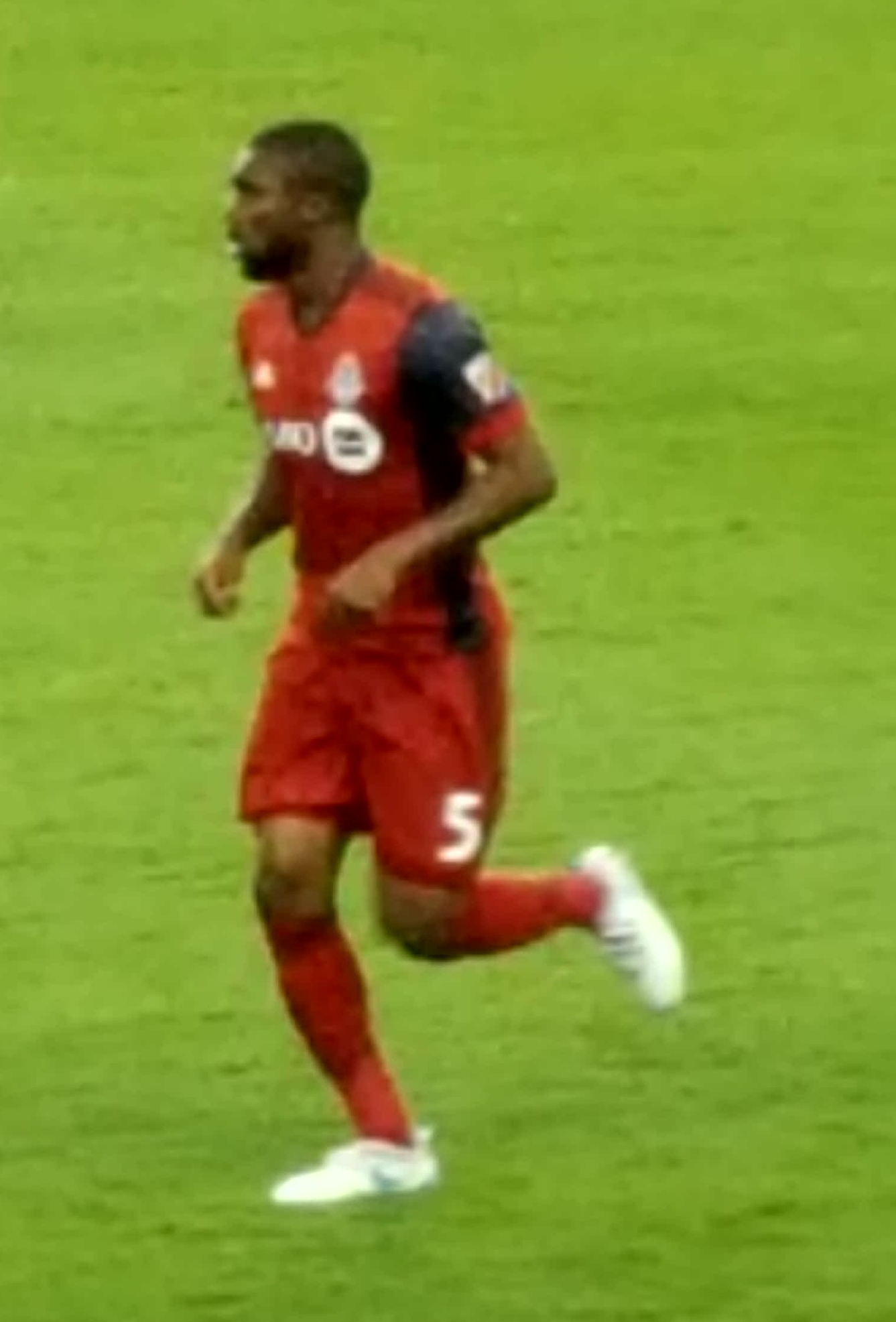
Morgan with Toronto FC in 2017

Morgan joined TFC Academy at age 16 in 2008, and went on to feature for the team in the Canadian Soccer League in 2009 and 2010.

Morgan made his professional debut for Toronto FC on October 20, 2010 in a CONCACAF Champions League match versus Árabe Unido from Panama. Morgan was able to play for the Senior squad of Toronto while not holding a professional contract. The game ended in a 1–0 win for Toronto with Morgan having a stand out performance that earned him much publicity.

In late January 2011 it was announced that Morgan would travel with Toronto's Senior team to Turkey for preseason training camp, Ashtone was one of four academy players invited to travel. He signed with Toronto FC on March 17, 2011. Morgan made his league debut on March 26, 2011 against Portland as a second half sub for Javier Martina. In the last third of the season Morgan became a regular starter for the reds with playing a full 90 minutes in 7 of the last 10 league games. Morgan finished the 2011 season with 14 league games.

Morgan cemented himself as the starting left back for Toronto in the 2012 season, he registered 3 assists in two games in late June. On July 5, the club announced that it had re-signed Morgan to a long-term deal.

However, with the arrival of Justin Morrow, Morgan saw his minutes decrease during the 2014 MLS season, mainly featuring as the club's back-up option at left back. With Morrow entrenched at the position going into the 2015 season, Morgan was loaned to Toronto FC II to get more playing time, while still being able to feature for the first team when needed. He made his debut for Toronto FC II against the Charleston Battery on March 21. However, with injuries to the first-team back line, Morgan was able to force his way back into the Toronto line-up during the 2015 season, and on May 2 he became the first player in Toronto FC history to make 100 appearances in all competitions for the club in a 1–0 victory over the Philadelphia Union. Despite missing the majority of the 2016 season due to injury, as Toronto FC made it to the 2016 MLS Cup, Morgan relished the club reaching its most successful season to date. Upon completion of the season, Morgan re-signed with Toronto FC before the 2017 season. Toronto declined his option for the 2020 season, ending his time with the club after nine seasons.

=== Real Salt Lake ===
On January 21, 2020, it was announced that Morgan would be signing with Real Salt Lake for the 2020 season. In December 2021 the club announced they had declined Morgan's contract option.

=== Forge FC ===
On February 1, 2022, Morgan signed with Canadian Premier League side Forge FC. He made his debut for Forge in their 2022 CONCACAF Champions League first-leg match against Cruz Azul on February 16. On January 23, 2023, Morgan re-signed with Forge FC for the 2023 season.

Morgan retired from professional soccer on July 31, 2023.

== International career ==
Morgan was a part of several Canadian U-16 camps in 2007, while also appearing for the U-20 side in late 2010. Morgan received his first international senior team call-up in late September when Stephen Hart announced his roster for two FIFA World Cup qualifying games against Saint Lucia and Puerto Rico. This made Morgan the first graduate of the Toronto FC Academy to be called up to the Canadian men's national team. Morgan made his debut against Saint Lucia as a second half sub for Simeon Jackson in a 7–0 away victory, he also received an assist for setting up Iain Hume who scored the 6th goal. Morgan was call-up to the national team in the next international window, Ashtone earned his first start for the national team against Saint Kitts and Nevis on November 15, the game ended in a 4–0 victory for the Canadians at the national stadium of BMO Field. On December 13 Morgan was awarded the 2011 Canadian U-20 Player of the Year, receiving 33.3% of the vote and just beating out Russell Teibert for the award.

On June 27, 2013 Morgan was listed as a part of the confirmed 23-man squad for Colin Miller's Canada squad for 2013 CONCACAF Gold Cup.

On May 30, 2019 Morgan was named to the final squad for the 2019 CONCACAF Gold Cup.

== Career statistics ==
=== Club ===
As of November 4, 2022

| Club | League | League | | | Playoffs | | National Cup | | Continental | | Total | |
| Club | League | Division | Apps | Goals | Apps | Goals | Apps | Goals | Apps | Goals | Apps | Goals |
|---|---|---|---|---|---|---|---|---|---|---|---|---|
| Toronto FC | 2010 | Major League Soccer | 0 | 0 | – | | 0 | 0 | 1 | 0 | 1 | 0 |
| Toronto FC | 2011 | Major League Soccer | 14 | 0 | – | | 0 | 0 | 8 | 0 | 22 | 0 |
| Toronto FC | 2012 | Major League Soccer | 30 | 0 | – | | 4 | 0 | 8 | 0 | 42 | 0 |
| Toronto FC | 2013 | Major League Soccer | 22 | 0 | – | | 2 | 0 | – | | 24 | 0 |
| Toronto FC | 2014 | Major League Soccer | 3 | 0 | – | | 2 | 0 | – | | 5 | 0 |
| Toronto FC | 2015 | Major League Soccer | 19 | 0 | 0 | 0 | 1 | 0 | – | | 20 | 0 |
| Toronto FC | 2016 | Major League Soccer | 7 | 0 | 0 | 0 | 2 | 0 | – | | 9 | 0 |
| Toronto FC | 2017 | Major League Soccer | 5 | 1 | 0 | 0 | 1 | 0 | – | | 6 | 1 |
| Toronto FC | 2018 | Major League Soccer | 18 | 0 | – | | 4 | 0 | 4 | 1 | 26 | 1 |
| Toronto FC | 2019 | Major League Soccer | 9 | 1 | 0 | 0 | 3 | 0 | 1 | 0 | 13 | 1 |
| Toronto FC | Total | | 127 | 2 | 0 | 0 | 19 | 0 | 22 | 1 | 168 | 3 |
| Toronto FC II (loan) | 2015 | USL | 1 | 0 | – | | – | | – | | 1 | 0 |
| Toronto FC II (loan) | 2016 | USL | 1 | 0 | – | | – | | – | | 1 | 0 |
| Toronto FC II (loan) | 2017 | USL | 7 | 1 | – | | – | | – | | 7 | 1 |
| Toronto FC II (loan) | 2018 | USL | 1 | 0 | – | | – | | – | | 1 | 0 |
| Toronto FC II (loan) | 2019 | USL League One | 1 | 0 | – | | – | | – | | 1 | 0 |
| Toronto FC II (loan) | Total | | 11 | 1 | 0 | 0 | 0 | 0 | 0 | 0 | 11 | 1 |
| Real Salt Lake | 2020 | Major League Soccer | 0 | 0 | – | | – | | – | | 0 | 0 |
| Real Salt Lake | 2021 | Major League Soccer | 8 | 0 | 1 | 0 | – | | – | | 9 | 0 |
| Real Salt Lake | Total | | 8 | 0 | 1 | 0 | 0 | 0 | 0 | 0 | 9 | 0 |
| Real Monarchs (loan) | 2020 | USL Championship | 1 | 0 | – | | – | | – | | 1 | 0 |
| Real Monarchs (loan) | 2021 | USL Championship | 4 | 0 | – | | – | | – | | 4 | 0 |
| Real Monarchs (loan) | Total | | 5 | 0 | 0 | 0 | 0 | 0 | 0 | 0 | 5 | 0 |
| Forge FC | 2022 | Canadian Premier League | 20 | 1 | 3 | 0 | 2 (Note: Includes appearance in the 2020 Canadian Championship final (played in 2022)) | 0 | 2 | 0 | 27 | 1 |
| Forge FC | 2023 | Canadian Premier League | 11 | 0 | 0 | 0 | 3 | 0 | – | | 14 | 0 |
| Forge FC | Total | | 31 | 1 | 3 | 0 | 5 | 0 | 0 | 0 | 39 | 0 |
| Career total | | | 182 | 4 | 4 | 0 | 24 | 0 | 24 | 1 | 234 | 5 |

=== International ===
As of January 16, 2020

Canada
| Year | Apps | Goals |
|---|---|---|
| 2011 | 2 | 0 |
| 2012 | 0 | 0 |
| 2013 | 9 | 0 |
| 2015 | 2 | 0 |
| 2016 | 0 | 0 |
| 2017 | 0 | 0 |
| 2018 | 1 | 0 |
| 2019 | 2 | 0 |
| 2020 | 2 | 0 |
| Total | 18 | 0 |

== Honours ==
=== Club ===
Toronto FC

- MLS Cup: 2017
- Canadian Championship (5): 2011, 2012, 2016, 2017, 2018
- Supporters' Shield: 2017

=== Individual ===
- Canadian U-20 Players of the Year: 2011
