= Álvaro Rey =

Spanish footballer

Personal information
- Full name: Álvaro Rey Vázquez
- Date of birth: 11 July 1989 (age 37)
- Place of birth: Seville, Spain
- Height: 1.83 m (6 ft 0 in)
- Position: Winger

Team information
- Current team: Europa
- Number: 37

Youth career
- AD Nervión

Senior career*
Years	Team	Apps	(Gls)
2007–2008	Cerro Águila	35	(7)
2008–2010	Betis C	50	(4)
2010	Betis B	4	(0)
2010	Pobla Mafumet	5	(2)
2010–2012	Gimnàstic	54	(1)
2012–2013	Xerez	28	(3)
2013–2014	Toronto FC	20	(1)
2014	Columbus Crew	2	(0)
2014–2017	Alcorcón	44	(0)
2015	→ Murcia (loan)	4	(0)
2017	Panetolikos	9	(2)
2017	Arka Gdynia	1	(0)
2017–2018	Racing Ferrol	13	(4)
2018–2020	Mirandés	71	(9)
2020–2021	Bolívar	12	(2)
2022	Deportivo La Coruña	11	(1)
2022–2023	Xerez	25	(8)
2023–2026	St Joseph's	57	(17)
2026–	Europa	6	(1)
- * Club domestic league appearances and goals as of 09:40, 21 November 2026 (UTC)

Álvaro Rey Vázquez (born 11 July 1989) is a Spanish professional footballer who plays as a winger for Gibraltarian club Europa.

== Club career ==
Rey was born in Seville, Andalusia. In the summer of 2010, after playing with both Real Betis' reserve teams, he signed for Gimnàstic de Tarragona in the Segunda División. He made his official debut on 31 October, featuring five minutes in a 1–1 home draw against Córdoba CF, and spent the vast majority of his first professional season switching between Gimnàstic and its farm team, CF Pobla de Mafumet.

On 4 December 2010, Rey started for Nàstic for the first time, in a 1–2 home defeat to Villarreal CF B. He scored his first goal for the Catalans on 21 January 2012, the only in the home match against Elche CF, but they eventually suffered relegation.

After two seasons with Gimnàstic, Rey was released. On 17 July 2012, he joined Xerez CD on a two-year contract.

The club dropped two levels at the end of the 2012–13 campaign due to financial irregularities, and subsequently Rey went on trial with Toronto FC of the Major League Soccer, appearing in a reserve team match and agreeing to a deal on 25 July 2013. He scored his first goal for his new club on 28 September, in a 4–1 win over D.C. United.

On 6 June 2014, Rey was traded to Columbus Crew for Dominic Oduro. His contract was terminated by mutual consent on 15 July, after alleging personal reasons, and he signed with AD Alcorcón later the same day.

On 14 February 2017, Rey agreed to a six-month contract at Super League Greece side Panetolikos FC. On 16 July, he moved to the Polish Ekstraklasa with Arka Gdynia.

After spells with clubs in Bolivia and the Spanish lower leagues – the exception to this was in the 2019–20 season, when he scored five second-tier goals for CD Mirandés– Rey joined St Joseph's F.C. of the Gibraltar Football League in July 2023.

== Career statistics ==
As of match played 14 June 2022

Appearances and goals by club, season and competition
Club	Season	League			Cup		Continental		Other		Total	
Club	Season	Division	Apps	Goals	Apps	Goals	Apps	Goals	Apps	Goals	Apps	Goals
Gimnàstic	2010–11	Segunda División	29	0	0	0	—		—		29	0
Gimnàstic	2011–12	Segunda División	25	1	0	0	—		—		25	1
Gimnàstic	Total		54	1	0	0	0	0	0	0	54	1
Xerez	2012–13	Segunda División	28	3	1	0	—		—		29	3
Toronto	2013	Major League Soccer	13	1	0	0	—		0	0	13	1
Toronto	2014	Major League Soccer	7	0	3	0	—		0	0	10	0
Toronto	Total		20	1	3	0	0	0	0	0	23	1
Columbus Crew	2014	Major League Soccer	2	0	0	0	—		0	0	2	0
Alcorcón	2014–15	Segunda División	13	0	0	0	—		—		13	0
Alcorcón	2015–16	Segunda División	25	0	1	0	—		—		26	0
Alcorcón	2016–17	Segunda División	6	0	6	0	—		—		12	0
Alcorcón	Total		44	0	7	0	0	0	0	0	51	0
Murcia (loan)	2014–15	Segunda División B	4	0	0	0	—		1 (Note: Appearances in promotion play-offs)	0	5	0
Panetolikos	2016–17	Super League Greece	9	2	0	0	—		0	0	9	2
Arka Gdynia	2017–18	Ekstraklasa	1	0	2	0	1	0	—		4	0
Racing Ferrol	2017–18	Segunda División B	13	4	0	0	—		—		13	4
Mirandés	2018–19	Segunda División B	37	4	1	0	—		5	2	43	6
Mirandés	2019–20	Segunda División	34	5	7	3	—		0	0	41	8
Mirandés	Total		71	9	8	3	0	0	5	2	84	14
Bolívar	2020	Bolivian Primera División	0	0	0	0	8	1	—		8	1
Bolívar	2021	Bolivian Primera División	12	2	0	0	6	0	—		18	2
Bolívar	Total		12	2	0	0	14	1	0	0	26	3
Deportivo	2021–22	Primera División RFEF	11	1	0	0	—		2	0	13	1
Career total			269	23	21	3	15	1	8	2	313	29
