= Greg Vanney =

American soccer player and coach

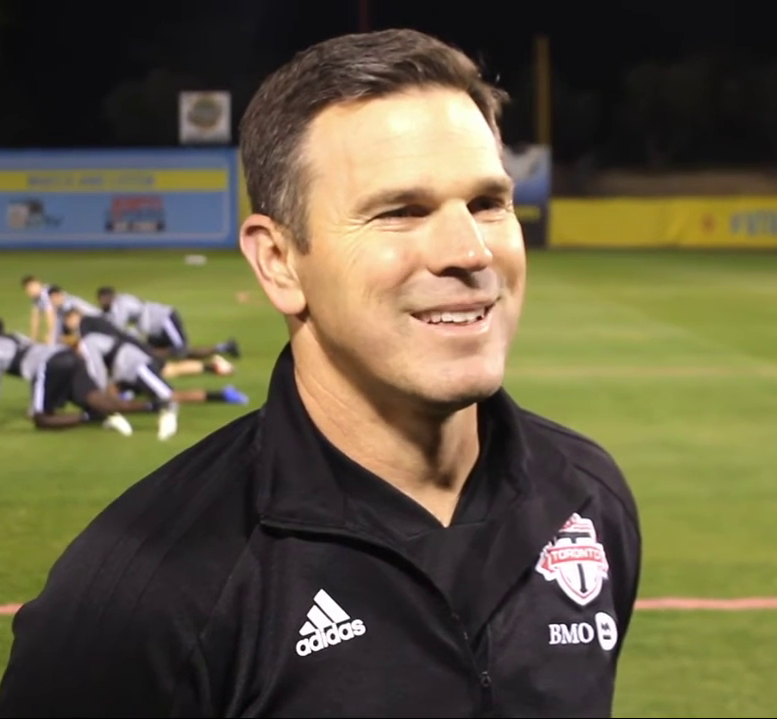
- Vanney as coach of Toronto FC in 2019

Personal information
- Date of birth: June 11, 1974 (age 52)
- Place of birth: South Boston, Virginia, United States
- Height: 5 ft 11 in (1.80 m)
- Position: Defender

Team information
- Current team: LA Galaxy (head coach)

College career
Years	Team	Apps	(Gls)
1992	FIU Golden Panthers		
1993–1995	UCLA Bruins		

Senior career*
Years	Team	Apps	(Gls)
1993	Tucson Amigos		
1996–2001	LA Galaxy	168	(21)
1996	→ Sacramento Scorpions	3	(3)
2002–2005	Bastia	65	(0)
2005–2006	FC Dallas	53	(1)
2007	Colorado Rapids	9	(0)
2007	D.C. United	15	(0)
2008	LA Galaxy	25	(0)
Total		338	(25)

International career^{‡}
1996–2006	United States	37	(1)

Managerial career
- 2014–2020: Toronto FC
- 2021–: LA Galaxy
Medal record
Men's soccer
Representing United States
CONCACAF Gold Cup
Winner	2005 United States
- * Club domestic league appearances and goals as of October 26, 2008 ‡ National team caps and goals as of October 26, 2008

Greg Vanney (born June 11, 1974) is an American soccer manager and former professional player who is the head coach of the LA Galaxy in Major League Soccer.

A defender and one of MLS's original players, Vanney spent 10 seasons in the league and another three-and-a-half in the French First Division playing for Sporting Club de Bastia between 2002 and 2005. He also earned 36 caps, scoring one goal, with the U.S. national team between 1996 and 2006.

In 2017, as coach of Toronto FC, Vanney won the domestic treble by lifting the MLS Cup, Supporters' Shield and the Canadian Championship, also being named MLS Coach of the Year. He won a second MLS Cup as coach of the LA Galaxy in 2024.

== Playing career ==
=== High school and college ===
Vanney played soccer for Marcos de Niza High School in Tempe, Arizona, and led the team to three consecutive state championship titles in 1990, 1991, and 1992. Vanney holds the school record for most assists by one player in a season with 13 for the 1990–1991 season, and also holds the school record for most goals by one player in a single season with 33 goals for the 1991–1992 season. He was also named the 5A player of the year for the 1991–1992 season, Gatorade Player of the Year, NSCAA and Parade All-America in 1992. Greg Vanney played college soccer for Florida International University in 1992, and for UCLA from 1993 to 1995. In 1995, Vanney was named All-America honorable mention and finished his senior season with 8 goals and 10 assists.

=== Professional ===
Vanney was drafted 17th overall in the 1996 MLS College Draft by the Los Angeles Galaxy. The team sent him on loan to the Sacramento Scorpions of USISL for three games at the beginning of the season where he netted three goals in three games including two game winners. Vanney played for the Galaxy for six years, from 1996 to 2001, and was consistently one of the best defenders in MLS, leading the Galaxy to three MLS Cup Finals and two CONCACAF Champion's Cup Finals. He was named to the MLS Best XI in both 2000 and 2001, and an MLS All-Star in 2001. After the 2001 MLS season, Vanney transferred to the French First Division club SC Bastia. In the first six months with Bastia, Vanney helped lead the French club to its first appearance in the Coupe de France Final in over 20 years. He left the club in 2005, coming back to MLS and signing with FC Dallas. After two seasons with the Hoops, and two All-Star selections, Vanney was traded to Colorado on January 12, 2007. On June 29, 2007, he was traded from the Rapids to D.C. United. On February 15, 2008, the rights for Vanney were transferred to his first club, the Los Angeles Galaxy. Vanney announced his retirement from the professional game on October 26, 2008; his last game against his former club FC Dallas.

=== International ===
Vanney also spent 11 years as a member of the United States national team, debuting December 21, 1996 against Guatemala, and played 36 games and scored one goal (September 2005). Vanney participated in three FIFA World Cup qualifying cycles for the United States (1998, 2002 and 2006). He was originally named as an alternate for the 2002 FIFA World Cup but initially replaced the injured Chris Armas on the roster after the midfielder picked up an ACL injury in a warm-up friendly against Uruguay on May 12, 2002. Vanney was himself injured in the next warm-up friendly on May 16, 2002, against Jamaica and was replaced on the roster by Steve Cherundolo. Vanney also was a member of the 2005 CONCACAF Gold Cup Championship team and was featured in the early part of 2006 FIFA World Cup qualifying for the United States.

== Coaching career ==
=== Early career ===
Vanney has more than 15 years experience in youth soccer: coaching, directing and consulting. He holds a USSF "A" Coaching License and has been actively involved with the U.S. Soccer Development Academy as a scout and other programming.

Vanney co-founded Arizona Futbol Club, a youth soccer club, in 1997 using a business plan Vanney started as a class assignment while attending UCLA. The club was later merged into Sereno Soccer Club.

Vanney was a member of the U.S. Soccer Education Staff that traveled to Spain in March 2010.

Vanney was an Academy Director for Real Salt Lake from 2008 to 2011. Vanney and his staff, with the support of Grande Sports World and Real Salt Lake, established the first MLS Residential Academy in the United States in fewer than 8 months. The U-18 and U-16 boys teams began play in Fall 2010.

Greg Vanney moved back to Arizona in 2008. For some time, he held two titles: (1.) Director of Soccer Operations at Grande Sports World in Casa Grande, Arizona and (2.) Director of the Real Salt Lake-Arizona Youth Academy. As Director of Soccer Operations, Vanney oversaw program and event development at the Grande Sports World facility featuring 8 professional quality fields; state-of-the-art 58,000 sq ft (5,400 m^{2}) performance center with 4 stadium quality locker rooms; 10,000 sq ft (930 m^{2}) weight room, physical therapy and 16 classrooms. In the first year, Vanney has help attract four professional teams (Real Salt Lake, Seattle Sounders FC, Colorado Rapids, and Vancouver Whitecaps FC) to the facility to host their preseason camps.

In January 2011, Vanney joined Chivas USA as an assistant coach.

=== Toronto FC ===
I think we need to change the energy, be more aggressive, be potentially less careful about making mistakes and looking to be more aggressive.

—

Vanney got his first head coaching job in Major League Soccer when he became the ninth head coach for Toronto FC after Ryan Nelsen was dismissed on August 31, 2014, with 10 games remaining in the 2014 regular season. He inherited a 9–9–6 record. In his debut match, Toronto lost 1–0 to the Philadelphia Union. His first win came in a match that finished 3–0 against Chivas USA. He finished off the 2014 season in seventh place in the Eastern Conference with a record of two wins, six losses and two ties.

Toronto were eliminated from the Canadian Championship during the 2015 season, although they qualified for the playoffs for the first time that season, after finishing sixth in the Eastern Conference. The club's rivals Montreal Impact eliminated Toronto in the knockout round.

During the 2016 season, Toronto won the Canadian Championship and qualified for the playoffs after finishing in third place in the Eastern Conference. They got to the MLS Cup final where they lost in shoot-out 5–4 to Seattle Sounders FC following a goalless draw after extra-time.

The arrival of Spanish playmaker Victor Vázquez in midfield at the beginning of the 2017 season saw less responsibility placed on the club's star forward Sebastian Giovinco and captain Michael Bradley to create Toronto's goalscoring opportunities, and this in turn freed up the Italian, enabling him to focus more on his attacking game; furthermore, Greg Vanney's switch in tactics from a 4–4–2 diamond to a 3–5–2 formation benefitted Giovinco's and Jozy Altidore's attacking partnership: by playing closer together, and with Vázquez now supporting them as the team's main creator, the attacking duo began to demonstrate a deeper understanding and an increased awareness of each other's movements, which improved their link-up play, and saw an increase in Altidore's goalscoring output throughout the season. On June 27, Toronto defeated Montreal 2–1 at home in the second leg of the 2017 Canadian Championship final to capture the title for the second consecutive season, edging Montreal 3–2 on aggregate. On September 30, 2017, Toronto FC captured the Supporters' Shield with a 4–2 home win over New York Red Bulls, to clinch top of the league with the most points that season. On November 27, 2017, Vanney won the MLS Coach of the Year award. On December 9, 2017, Vanney led Toronto FC to MLS Cup victory in a 2–0 victory against Seattle. Greg Vanney was also named CONCACAF Coach of the Year.

Following an early round play-off elimination, Vanney resigned as coach of Toronto FC on December 1, 2020.

=== LA Galaxy ===
In January 2021, Vanney was named as head coach of the LA Galaxy, his former club, where he played for seven seasons.

After narrowly missing the playoffs in 2021, Vanney's Galaxy finished fourth in the Western Conference (ninth overall) in the 2022 season, the highest positions for the club since 2016. LA beat Nashville 1–0 in the first round, but fell to rivals Los Angeles FC 3–2 in the conference semifinals.

In 2024, Vanney led the Galaxy to its highest points total since 1998 (64, on par with the 2014 MLS Cup-winning side). The Galaxy would win MLS Cup against the New York Red Bulls, 2-1, thus giving Vanney his second MLS Cup as a coach and the Galaxy's first in exactly 10 years.

== Personal life ==
Vanney is the uncle of LA Galaxy defender Eriq Zavaleta.

== Broadcasting ==
In 2009, Greg Vanney provided color commentary with play-by-play announcer Kevin Calabro for Seattle Sounders FC games on FSN Northwest and KONG-TV and radio.

== Other ==
Vanney participates on the U.S. Soccer Professional Referee Committee as well as being a representative on the U.S. Soccer Athlete's Council.

== Coaching statistics ==
As of match played 7 November 2026

Coaching record by team and tenure
Team	Nat	From	To	Record							
Team	Nat	From	To	G	W	D	L	GF	GA	GD	Win %
Toronto FC	(Canada)	August 31, 2014	December 1, 2020	252	113	58	81	428	347	+81	44.84
LA Galaxy	(United States)	January 5, 2021	Present	239	91	60	88	395	392	+3	38.08
Total				491	204	118	169	823	739	+84	41.55

== Honors ==
=== Player ===
Los Angeles Galaxy

- Western Conference (Playoffs): 1996, 1999, 2001
- Supporters' Shield: 1998
- U.S. Open Cup: 2001
- CONCACAF Champions' Cup: 2000

D.C. United

- Supporters' Shield: 2007

United States

- CONCACAF Gold Cup: 2005

Individual

- MLS All-Star: 2000
- MLS Best XI: 2000, 2001

=== Coach ===
Toronto FC

- MLS Cup: 2017
- Eastern Conference (Playoffs): 2016, 2017, 2019
- Supporters' Shield: 2017
- Canadian Championship: 2016, 2017, 2018
- Trillium Cup: 2014, 2016, 2017, 2019

LA Galaxy

- MLS Cup: 2024
- Western Conference (Playoff): 2024

Individual

- MLS Coach of the Year: 2017
- CONCACAF Coach of the Year: 2017
