= 2014 Toronto FC season =

Toronto FC 2014 soccer season

Toronto FC
2014 season
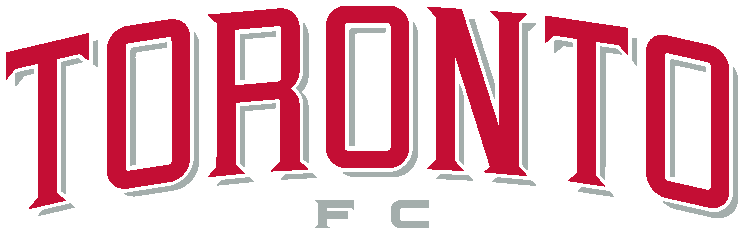
- General manager: Tim Bezbatchenko
- Head coach: Ryan Nelsen (until August 31); Greg Vanney (from August 31)
- Stadium: BMO Field
- Major League Soccer: Conference: 7th Overall: 13th
- MLS Cup playoffs: Did not qualify
- Canadian Championship: Runners-up
- Top goalscorer: League: Jermain Defoe (11); All: Jermain Defoe (12)
- Highest home attendance: 22,591
- Lowest home attendance: 18,269
- Average home league attendance: 22,086
Home colours	Away colours

The 2014 Toronto FC season was the eighth season in club history.

During the off-season, Toronto FC agreed to a one-year partnership with USL outfit Wilmington Hammerheads. Jackson, Justin Morrow, Dwayne De Rosario, Gilberto, Michael Bradley, Jermain Defoe, Bradley Orr, Collen Warner, Luke Moore, Dominic Oduro, Warren Creavalle and Júlio César came to Toronto in the offseason.

Toronto opened pre-season on January 24. The club began the MLS season on March 15 against the Seattle Sounders, and finished on October 25 against the New England Revolution.

== Background ==
=== Background information ===
During the 2013 season, Toronto FC finished second from bottom of the Eastern Conference. They had finished 19th out of 19 teams in the 2012 season. Toronto held off renewal of season tickets "months later than normal — hoping that off-season moves have given ticket-holders a reason to get back on board." Toronto FC agreed to a one-year partnership with USL outfit Wilmington Hammerheads on January 22. In the deal, will receive a minimum of four Toronto FC reserve team players. Also included in the deal is invitation for the Wilmington Hammerheads to attend the club's pre–season training camp in Florida, the club's coaching curriculum, and an MLS club's professional environment which includes a business relationship and a friendly.

During the off-season, Toronto acquired Jackson, Issey Nakajima-Farran, Justin Morrow, and Dwayne De Rosario. Gilberto signed as a designated player. Gilberto had "turned down deals in Mexico, Germany, and other countries." In addition to Gilberto, Michael Bradley and Jermain Defoe joined the club as designated players. Defoe was due to join Toronto on February 28 from Tottenham Hotspur. However, Defoe didn't join Toronto until March 9 due to International duty with England. Bradley Orr and Júlio César joined Toronto on loan.

The options on Gale Agbossoumonde, Joe Bendik, Mark Bloom, Bright Dike, Jeremy Hall, Chris Konopka, Reggie Lambe, Ryan Richter, Quillan Roberts, Emery Welshman, and Andrew Wiedeman were exercised. Joe Bendik signed a new contract. Greg Vanney was hired as Assistant General Manager and the Academy Director on December 11.

Tim Bezbatchenko confirmed that Darel Russell, Michael Thomas, Stefan Frei, Justin Braun, and Danny Koevermans would not return to the club in 2014 after their contracts expired or their options were declined. The right to sign Stefan Frei was traded to the Seattle Sounders FC. Stefan Frei was the longest-serving player at the club at the time of the trade. Richard Eckersley and Matías Laba were traded. Jonas Elmer and Toronto FC "mutually agreed to part ways." Emery Welshman and Reggie Lambe were placed on waivers.

=== Robert Earnshaw and Bobby Convey ===
Robert Earnshaw and Bobby Convey options were also declined. Bobby Convey had expected to return to the club. However, Toronto FC General Manager Tim Bezbatchenko stated that he wanted Bobby Convey back at the club and stated that he "could be an important piece." The club are "attempting to make the veteran's salary cap hit match his on-field production." Tim Bezbatchenko also stated that he wanted Robert Earnshaw back at the club. The rights to Bobby Convey were traded to the New York Red Bulls.

=== Designated player search ===
The club was in the process of a "lengthy search" for a "marquee-designated player". MLSE President Tim Leiweke, Club General Manager Tim Bezbatchenko, and Head Coach Ryan Nelsen traveled to Europe in October 2013 to search for such a player. Leiweke was quoted, stating, that "the days of us putting our toe in the water and trying to find a cheap DP (designated player) are over. We're going to go swing for the fences." The club wanted to sign two strikers in the January transfer window and were at the "top of the list." The attention was on clubs in the Premier League and Serie A. Jermain Defoe, Alberto Gilardino Samuel Eto'o and Fabio Quagliarella were rumoured to join Toronto FC. The club denied the report about signing Defoe, but Bezbatchenko stated that "it's obvious the public "knows" who the targets are." Bezbatchenko also stated that "We've identified 3–5 (potential Designated Players) that would fit the role" and that "We're really honing in [sic] on two." Another name in the media was Gilberto. Toronto FC was in competition with clubs in La Liga, Liga MX, Serie A, and Bundesliga for Gilberto's signature. Gilberto was in Toronto and was at the Toronto Raptors game on December 10. Gilberto signed for the club on December 14. Michael Bradley and Defoe joined Gilberto as designated players. Defoe joined Toronto on February 28. Defoe was part of a marketing campaign with the club. The club put together a television advertisement stating that it's a "bloody big deal" that Defoe is coming to Toronto FC. The ad was also online and had close to 60,000 views in a day. The ads were running on The Sports Network and Sportsnet with Toronto being the main focus of the marketing campaign. Even though MLSE was using Defoe in their marketing campaigns, British newspaper The Guardian stated "The money may be good but the club are woeful and playing in Canada may end the striker's World Cup hopes."

=== Transactions ===
==== In ====
Date	Player	Position	Previous club	Fee/notes	Ref
December 9	(Brazil) Jackson	MF	(United States) FC Dallas	Traded for allocation cash and a conditional second-round pick.	
December 14	(Brazil) Gilberto	FW	(Brazil) Internacional	Signed as a designated player.	
December 17	(United States) Justin Morrow	DF	(United States) San Jose Earthquakes	Acquired in a trade with San Jose Earthquakes for allocation money	
December 18	(Canada) Dwayne De Rosario	MF	(United States) D.C. United	Selected in the second round of the Re-Entry Draft from D.C. United	
January 9	(Canada) Jordan Hamilton	FW	(Canada) TFC Academy	Graduated from Academy.	
January 13	(United States) Michael Bradley	MF	(Italy) Roma	$10 million; signed as designated player.	
January 24	(England) Bradley Orr	DF	(England) Blackburn Rovers	Loan deal until December 2014.	
February 14	(Brazil) Júlio César	GK	(England) Queens Park Rangers	Signed on loan.	
February 28	(England) Jermain Defoe	FW	(England) Tottenham Hotspur	$10 million, signed as a designated player	
March 28	(Canada) Issey Nakajima-Farran	MF	(Cyprus) AEK Larnaca	Signed on free transfer	
May 8	(England) Luke Moore	FW	(United States) Chivas USA	Acquired in three team trade which sent Gale Agbossoumonde to the Colorado Rapids.	
May 16	(United States) Collen Warner	MF	(Canada) Montreal Impact	Acquired in trade which sent Issey Nakajima-Farran and allocation money to the Montreal Impact.	
June 6	(Ghana) Dominic Oduro	MF	(United States) Columbus Crew	Acquired in trade that sent Álvaro Rey to the Columbus Crew.	
July 23	(United States) Warren Creavalle	MF/DF	(United States) Houston Dynamo	Acquired in trade with the #14 allocation spot which sent allocation money and the #1 allocation spot to the Houston Dynamo.	
September 15	(Canada) Chris Mannella	MF	(Canada) TFC Academy	Graduated from academy.	

==== Out ====
Date	Player	Position	Destination club	Fee/notes	Ref
November 29	(Wales) Robert Earnshaw	FW	(England) Blackpool	Option declined	
November 29	(United States) Bobby Convey	MF	(United States) New York Red Bulls	Option declined; the rights and a second round pick in the 2014 MLS SuperDraft was traded to New York Red Bulls for a first round pick in the 2014 MLS SuperDraft and a third round pick in the 2016 MLS SuperDraft.	
November 29	(England) Darel Russell	MF	(United States) Tampa Bay Rowdies	Option declined	
November 29	(United States) Michael Thomas	MF	(United States) Oklahoma City Energy	Option declined	
November 29	(United States) Justin Braun	FW	(United States) Sacramento Republic	Out of contract.	
November 29	(Switzerland) Stefan Frei	GK	(United States) Seattle Sounders FC	Out of contract; rights traded for a conditional 2015 MLS SuperDraft first round pick.	
November 29	(Netherlands) Danny Koevermans	FW	(Netherlands) Utrecht	Out of contract.	
January 27	(England) Richard Eckersley	DF	(United States) New York Red Bulls	Traded for a fourth-round pick in the 2017 MLS SuperDraft.	
February 7	(Switzerland) Jonas Elmer	DF	(Switzerland) FC Winterthur	Elmer and Toronto FC "mutually agreed to part ways."	
February 25	(Canada) Emery Welshman	FW	(Canada) Sigma FC	Placed on waivers.	
February 26	(Argentina) Matías Laba	MF	(Canada) Vancouver Whitecaps FC	Traded for future considerations.	
March 5	(Bermuda) Reggie Lambe	MF	(Sweden) Nyköpings BIS	Placed on waivers.	
May 8	(United States) Gale Agbossoumonde	DF	(United States) Colorado Rapids	Traded for Luke Moore.	
May 16	(Canada) Issey Nakajima-Farran	MF	(Canada) Montreal Impact	Traded with allocation money to the Montreal Impact for Collen Warner.	
June 6	(Spain) Álvaro Rey	MF	(United States) Columbus Crew	Traded for Dominic Oduro.	
July 25	(Brazil) Júlio César	GK	(England) Queens Park Rangers	Recalled from loan.	

== Pre–season ==
=== Review ===
Toronto Opened pre–season on January 24 and left for a training camp in Florida on January 27. The expectations are "sky high" coming into pre–season. During pre–season training camp in Florida, Toronto defeated D.C. United 1–0 before returning to Toronto on February 7. However, Toronto returned to Florida to play in the Walt Disney World Pro Soccer Classic in Orlando, Florida. During the tournament, Toronto lost to Columbus Crew 3–1, tied Orlando City SC 1–1, tied Philadelphia Union 0–0, lost to Fluminense FC U23 team 4–2. During pre–season, Bright Dike injured his leg and will be out for six months. Doneil Henry trained with West Ham United during West Ham United for two and a half weeks.

=== Pre–season results ===
Walt Disney World Pro Soccer Classic

Win Draw Loss

Date	Venue	Opponent	Res. F–A	Goalscorers		Ref.
Date	Venue	Opponent	Res. F–A	Toronto FC	Opponent	Ref.
February 19	A	Columbus Crew	1–3	Wahl 14' (o.g.)	Higuaín 10'; Williams 12'; Bedell 61'	
February 22	H	Orlando City SC	1–1	Bekker 13' (pen.)	Howard 87'	
February 26	A	Philadelphia Union	0–0			
March 1	H	Fluminense FC U23	2–4	Bradley 26'; De Rosario 36'	Pablo 18'; Igor Julião 36'; Carvalho 53' (pen.); Robert 56'	

== Major League Soccer ==
=== Regular season ===
==== Review ====
===== March–April =====
Toronto faced Seattle Sounders FC on March 15 in their season opener after having a bye–week during the opening weekend in the Major League Soccer season. Toronto won the match 2–1. Jermain Defoe scored both goals for Toronto and Clint Dempsey scored for Seattle. Gilberto didn't travel with the team to Seattle due to an injury. Gilberto suffered a hip flexor injury during pre–season. Bright Dike is out long–term. Michael Bradley, Justin Morrow, Bradley Orr, and Álvaro Rey were "questionable" for the game. Bradley, Morrow, and Rey started the match and Orr came on as a substitute in the 65th minute. Doneil Henry started the match and made his 50th league appearance. Dempsey got a two-game suspension for "violent conduct" from an incident with Mark Bloom. Dempsey had hit Bloom in the groin. Toronto's first home game is against D.C. United on March 22. Toronto won 1–0 with a goal from Jermain Defoe. This is the first time that Toronto won the first two games of the season. Toronto faced Real Salt Lake on March 29. Real Salt Lake won 3–0 with goals from Álvaro Saborío (2 Goals) and Luis Gil. Jackson was suspended for the match.

Toronto starts April with a 2–0 win against the Columbus Crew on April 5. Steven Caldwell was suspended for the match.

===== August =====
Then Toronto tied Chicago Fire 2–2 on August 23. Bakary Soumaré (own goal) and Gilberto scored for Toronto and Robert Earnshaw and Quincy Amarikwa scored for Chicago. Steven Caldwell and Justin Morrow left the game injured. To finish off August, Toronto lost to New England Revolution 3–0 on August 30 with goals from Lee Nguyen, Kelyn Rowe, and Teal Bunbury. All three goals came off of turnovers. Toronto turned the ball over which led to Nguyen and Rowe scoring and the ball came off the referee after Michael Bradley tried "to swing the ball right sideline" which led to Bunbury's goal. The following day, head coach Ryan Nelsen and his assistants were fired. Greg Vanney became the new head coach.

===== September =====
Toronto started September with two games against the Philadelphia Union. In the first match, on September 3, Philadelphia won 1–0 with a goal from Conor Casey. Ashtone Morgan, who made his first appearance since the opening game of the season, was sent–off after "pulling down" Sébastien Le Toux while Le Toux was "on a breakaway." This was Greg Vanney's first match in–charge as head coach. In the second match, on September 6, Philadelphia won 2–0 with goals from Connor Casey and Andrew Wenger. The second match was Vanney's first home match since he became the new head coach. The loss to Philadelphia meant Philadelphia overtook Toronto in the Eastern Conference standings. Then, on September 13, Toronto tied Chicago Fire 1–1. Michael Bradley was critical of the referee after the match and was eventually fined an undisclosed amount for the comment. Then on September 21, Toronto defeated Chivas USA 3–0 with goals from Jackson, Luke Moore, and Gilberto.

==== Regular season results ====
Win Draw Loss

MD	Date KO EST	Venue	Opponent	Res. F–A	Att.	Goalscorers and disciplined players		Ref.
MD	Date KO EST	Venue	Opponent	Res. F–A	Att.	Toronto FC	Opponent	Ref.
1	March 15; 4:30 p.m.	A	Seattle Sounders FC	2–1	38,441	Defoe 17', 24'; Rey (yellow card) 63'; Morrow (yellow card) 78'; César (yellow card) 83'	Dempsey 68'; Alonso (yellow card) 70'	
2	March 22; 4:30 p.m.	H	D.C. United	1–0	22,591	Jackson (yellow card) 50'; Defoe 60'	Arnaud (yellow card) 55'	
3	March 29; 9:30 p.m.	A	Real Salt Lake	0–3	18,881	Defoe (yellow card) 29'; Henry (yellow card) 31'; Caldwell (yellow card) 35'	Saborío 11' (pen.), 55'; Gil 28'; Schuler (yellow card) 38'	
4	April 5; 6:00 p.m.	A	Columbus Crew	2–0	12,045	Bradley 11'; Bloom (yellow card) 34'; Issey 85'		
5	April 12; 4:00 p.m.	H	Colorado Rapids	0–1	22,591	Caldwell (yellow card) 17'	Buddle 11'	
6	April 19; 8:30 p.m.	A	FC Dallas	1–2	17,406	Issey 21' (yellow card) 55'; Jackson (yellow card) 74'	Hedges 37'; Pérez 88'	
7	May 3; 1:00 p.m.	H	New England Revolution	1–2	22,591	Jackson 6' (yellow card) 43'; Bradley (yellow card) 58'	Mullins 24'; Nguyen 82' (pen.); Fagúndez (yellow card) 75'; Caldwell (yellow card) 90+2'	
8	May 17; 4:30 p.m.	H	New York Red Bulls	2–0	22,591	Defoe 12' (yellow card) 88'; Morrow (yellow card) 45'; Moore 90+5'	Henry (yellow card) 4'; Olave (yellow card) 42'; Armando (yellow card) 88'	
9	May 23; 8:30 p.m.	A	Sporting Kansas City	2–2	19,914	Moore 67' (yellow card) 84'; Orr 90+1'; Caldwell (red card) 63'; Gilberto (yellow card) 39'; Bloom (yellow card) 57'	Dwyer 47' 84' (pen.); Nagamura (yellow card) 79'	
10	May 31; 5:00 p.m.	H	Columbus Crew	3–2	22,591	Defoe 21' (pen.) 81'; Henry 90+2' (yellow card) 90+4'; Bendik (yellow card) 66'; Gilberto (yellow card) 77'; Bekker (yellow card) 80'	Meram 18'; Viana 65' (yellow card) 60'; Parkhurst (yellow card) 39'; Wahl (yellow card) 83'	
11	June 7; 4:00 p.m.	H	San Jose Earthquakes	1–0	22,591	Defoe 27' (pen.) (yellow card) 90+3'; Henry (yellow card) 17'; Hagglund (yellow card) 84'	Cronin (yellow card) 60'; Goodson (yellow card) 66'	
12	June 27; 8:00 p.m.	A	New York Red Bulls	2–2	20,176	Defoe 55'; Gilberto 72'; Morrow (yellow card) 11'	Luyindula 36'; Wright-Phillips 90+3'	
13	July 2; 8:30 p.m.	A	Chicago Fire	1–1	13,153	Moore (red card) 29'; Jackson 43'; Caldwell (yellow card) 53'	Amarikwa (yellow card) 45+2'; Shipp 57'; Palmer (yellow card) 86'	
14	July 5; 4:00 p.m.	H	D.C. United	1–2	22,591	Moore 60'; Hagglund (red card) 89'	DeLeon 54'; Kitchen 70'	
15	July 12; 7:00 p.m.	H	Houston Dynamo	4–2	22,591	Osorio 39'; Oduro 45+1'; Defoe (yellow card) 37' (goal) 63' 89'	Davis 13' 30'; Sarkodie (yellow card) 35'; Taylor (yellow card) 37'; Horst (yellow card) 40'; Ricardo Clark (yellow card) 56'; Creavalle (yellow card) 59'	
16	July 16; 8:00 p.m.	H	Vancouver Whitecaps FC	1–1	22,591	Defoe 64' (pen.); Orr (yellow card) 28'; Warner (yellow card) 90+4'	Mattocks 50'; Teibert (yellow card) 28'; Reo-Coker (yellow card) 70'; Adekugbe (yellow card) 85'	
17	July 19; 9:00 p.m.	A	Houston Dynamo	2–2	20,069			
18	July 26; 7:00 p.m.	H	Sporting Kansas City	1–2	22,591	Jackson 16' (yellow card) 32'; Morrow (yellow card) 35'; Oduro (yellow card) 44'; Henry (yellow card) 45+2'; Bradley (yellow card) 73'	Zusi 48'; Besler (yellow card) 53' (yellow card) 75' (red card); Peterson 80'	
19	July 30; 7:00 p.m.	A	D.C. United	0–3	16,171	Warner (yellow card) 36'; Bradley (yellow card) 68'	Johnson 8' (yellow card) 90'; Arnaud (yellow card) 42'; Korb (yellow card) 54'; Rolfe 59'; Hagglund 67' (o.g.)	
20	August 3; 6:00 p.m.	A	Montreal Impact	2–0	16,665	Gilberto 11'; Moore 54'	Król (yellow card) 32'; Ferrari (yellow card) 53'; Camara (yellow card) 77'	
21	August 9; 7:30 p.m.	A	Columbus Crew	3–2	17,822	Gilberto 43'; Henry (yellow card) 53'; Osorio 59'; Moore 84'	Higuaín 45+2' (pen.); Meram 81'	
22	August 16; 8:30 p.m.	A	Sporting Kansas City	1–4	20,730	Gilberto 45+1' (pen.)		
23	August 23; 7:00 p.m.	H	Chicago Fire	2–2	22,591	Soumaré 3' (o.g.); Warner (yellow card) 57'; Gilberto 79'	Palmer (yellow card) 20'; Alex (yellow card) 39'; Soumaré (yellow card) 46'; Earnshaw 70'; Amarikwa 90'; Segares (yellow card) 90+1'	
24	August 30; 5:00 p.m.	H	New England Revolution	0–3	22,591	Gilberto (yellow card) 82'	Nguyen 2'; Bunbury (yellow card) 4' (goal) 58'; Rowe 21' (yellow card) 36'; Caldwell (yellow card) 47'	
25	September 3; 7:00 p.m.	A	Philadelphia Union	0–1	15,238	Morgan (red card) 77'; Bradley (yellow card) 83'; Henry (yellow card) 90+3'	Edu (yellow card) 33'; Casey 55'	
26	September 6; 2:00 p.m.	H	Philadelphia Union	0–2	22,591	Henry (yellow card) 28'	Casey 8'; Wenger 44'	
27	September 13; 8:30 p.m.	A	Chicago Fire	1–1	18,691	Hagglund (yellow card) 47'; Morrow (yellow card) 62'; De Rosario 89'	Palmer 11'; Nyassi (yellow card) 41'	
28	September 21; 3:00 p.m.	H	Chivas USA	3–0	22,591	Jackson 23' (red card) 66'; Moore 45+2'; Gilberto 54'; Lovitz (yellow card) 75'	Sturgis (yellow card) 38'; Reo-Coker (red card) 66'	
29	September 27; 1:00 p.m.	H	Portland Timbers	3–2	22,591	Hagglund 62', 70'; Bradley 89'; Moore (yellow card) 90+1'	Fanendo Adi 13'; Caldwell 16' (o.g.); Chará (yellow card) 45+7'; Valeri (yellow card) 88'	
30	October 4; 10:30 p.m.	A	LA Galaxy	0–3	24,064	Osorio (yellow card) 66'	Keane 22', 25'; Sarvas (yellow card) 66'; Gordon 90+3'	
31	October 8; 7:30 p.m.	H	Houston Dynamo	0–1	18,269	Lovitz (yellow card) 90+5'	Barnes 35'; Cochran (red card) 55'	
32	October 11; 7:00 p.m.	A	New York Red Bulls	1–3	24,068	Creavalle (yellow card) 33'; Osorio 55'; Hagglund (red card) 86'; Bradley (yellow card) 89'	Eckersley (yellow card) 15'; Wright-Phillips 26'; Izquierdo 35'; McCarty 44'; Alexander (yellow card) 78'; Olave (yellow card) 90+4'	
33	October 18; 2:00 p.m.	H	Montreal Impact	1–1	18,329	Creavalle 20'; Jackson (yellow card) 88'; Osorio (red card) 90+3'; Bendik (yellow card) 90+4'; De Rosario (yellow card) 90+5'	Camara (yellow card) 5' (yellow card) 90+5' (red card); Martins 39'; Ferrari (yellow card) 55'; Pearce (red card) 82'; Bush (yellow card) 90'	
34	October 25; 7:30 p.m.	A	New England Revolution	0–1	32,766	Morrow (yellow card) 61'	Nguyen 35'	

==== Table ====
===== Conference =====
Pos	Team	Pld	W	L	T	GF	GA	GD	Pts	Qualification
1	D.C. United	34	17	9	8	52	37	+15	59	Qualification for the conference semifinals
2	New England Revolution	34	17	13	4	51	37	+14	55	Qualification for the conference semifinals
3	Columbus Crew SC	34	14	10	10	52	42	+10	52	Qualification for the conference semifinals
4	New York Red Bulls	34	13	10	11	55	50	+5	50	Qualification for the knockout round
5	Sporting Kansas City	34	14	13	7	48	41	+7	49	Qualification for the knockout round
6	Philadelphia Union	34	10	12	12	51	51	0	42	
7	Toronto FC	34	11	15	8	44	54	−10	41	
8	Houston Dynamo	34	11	17	6	39	58	−19	39	
9	Chicago Fire	34	6	10	18	41	51	−10	36	
10	Montreal Impact	34	6	18	10	38	58	−20	28	

Source: MLS

===== Overall =====
Pos	Team	Pld	W	L	T	GF	GA	GD	Pts	Qualification
1	Seattle Sounders FC (S, U)	34	20	10	4	65	50	+15	64	Qualification for the CONCACAF Champions League
2	LA Galaxy (C)	34	17	7	10	69	37	+32	61	Qualification for the CONCACAF Champions League
3	D.C. United	34	17	9	8	52	37	+15	59	Qualification for the CONCACAF Champions League
4	Real Salt Lake	34	15	8	11	54	39	+15	56	Qualification for the CONCACAF Champions League
5	New England Revolution	34	17	13	4	51	46	+5	55	
6	FC Dallas	34	16	12	6	55	45	+10	54	
7	Columbus Crew	34	14	10	10	52	42	+10	52	
8	New York Red Bulls	34	13	10	11	55	50	+5	50	
9	Vancouver Whitecaps FC	34	12	8	14	42	40	+2	50	Qualification for the CONCACAF Champions League
10	Sporting Kansas City	34	14	13	7	48	41	+7	49	
11	Portland Timbers	34	12	9	13	61	52	+9	49	
12	Philadelphia Union	34	10	12	12	51	51	0	42	
13	Toronto FC	34	11	15	8	44	54	−10	41	
14	Houston Dynamo	34	11	17	6	39	58	−19	39	
15	Chicago Fire	34	6	10	18	41	51	−10	36	
16	Chivas USA	34	9	19	6	29	61	−32	33	
17	Colorado Rapids	34	8	18	8	43	62	−19	32	
18	San Jose Earthquakes	34	6	16	12	35	50	−15	30	
19	Montreal Impact (V)	34	6	18	10	38	58	−20	28	

Source: MLS
Rules for classification: 1) points; 2) head-to-head record; 3) goal difference; 4) number of goals scored
(C) MLS Cup champions; (S) Supporters' Shield winners; (U) U.S. Open Cup winners; (V) Canadian Championship winners

==== Results summary ====
Overall								Home						Away					
Pld	Pts	W	L	T	GF	GA	GD	W	L	T	GF	GA	GD	W	L	T	GF	GA	GD
34	41	11	15	8	44	54	−10	7	7	3	24	23	+1	4	8	5	20	31	−11

Last updated: October 25, 2014
Source: Results
Pld = Matches played; Pts = Points; W = Matches won; T = Matches tied; L = Matches lost; GF = Goals for; GA = Goals against; GD = Goal difference

== Canadian Championship ==
Toronto FC opened their attempt to win the 2014 Canadian Championship against Vancouver Whitecaps FC, due to the seeding procedure used for the Championship.

=== Canadian Championship results ===
Win Draw Loss

Leg	Date	Venue	Opponent	Res. F–A	Agg. score F–A	Att.	Goalscorers and disciplined players		Ref.
Leg	Date	Venue	Opponent	Res. F–A	Agg. score F–A	Att.	Toronto FC	Opponent	Ref.
Semi–final
FL	May 7	H	Vancouver Whitecaps FC	2–1	—	22,591	Defoe 28'; Bradley (yellow card) 28', (goal) 89'; De Rosario (yellow card) 90'	Mitchell (yellow card) 48'; Reo-Coker (yellow card) 60'; Manneh 90', (yellow card) 90'	
SL	May 14	A	Vancouver Whitecaps	1–2 (a.e.t.)	3–3 (5–3 p)	18,470	Henry 4', (yellow card) 58'; Bekker (yellow card) 16'; Orr (yellow card) 89'; Bloom (yellow card) 92+'	Mitchell (yellow card) 30'; Hurtado 43'; Salgado (yellow card) 78'; Morales 86' (pen.)	
Final
FL	May 28	H	Montreal Impact	1–1	—	18,269	Henry 20'; Rey (yellow card) 35'	Mapp 73'; Lefèvre (yellow card) 83'	
SL	June 4	A	Montreal Impact	0–1	1–2	13,423		Bernardello (yellow card) 4'; Felipe 90+1'	

== Mid-season friendlies ==
=== Results ===
Win Draw Loss

Date	Venue	Opponent	Res. F–A	Att.	Goalscorers and disciplined players		Ref.
Date	Venue	Opponent	Res. F–A	Att.	Toronto FC	Opponent	Ref.
June 18	A	Wilmington Hammerheads	2–1	—	De Rosario 20' (pen.); Hoilett 26'	Godelman 85'	
July 23	H	Tottenham Hotspur	2–3	22,591	Wiedeman 65'; Hamilton 73'	Lamela 16', 40'; Townsend 85'	

== Statistics ==
=== Team record ===
As of October 25, 2014

Competition	First match	Last match	Record								
Competition	First match	Last match	G	W	L	T	GF	GA	GD	Win %	Ref.
Regular season	March 15	October 25	34	11	15	8	44	54	−10	32.35	Regular season results
Canadian Championship	May 7	June 4	4	1	2	1	4	5	−1	25.00	Canadian Championship results
Total			38	12	17	9	48	59	−11	31.58	—

=== Squad and statistics ===
As of October 25, 2014

No.	Pos	Nat	Player	Total		Major League Soccer		Canadian Championship	
No.	Pos	Nat	Player	Apps	Goals	Apps	Goals	Apps	Goals
1	GK	(United States) USA	Chris Konopka	0	0	0+0	0	0+0	0
2	DF	(United States) USA	Justin Morrow	34	0	30+1	0	2+1	0
3	DF	(United States) USA	Warren Creavalle	10	1	7+3	1	0+0	0
4	MF	(United States) USA	Michael Bradley	27	3	25+0	2	2+0	1
5	DF	(Canada) CAN	Ashtone Morgan	5	0	2+1	0	2+0	0
7	FW	(Nigeria) NGR	Bright Dike	2	0	0+2	0	0+0	0
8	MF	(Canada) CAN	Kyle Bekker	24	0	13+7	0	3+1	0
9	FW	(Brazil) BRA	Gilberto	32	7	21+7	7	3+1	0
11	MF	(Brazil) BRA	Jackson	26	4	21+5	4	0+0	0
12	GK	(United States) USA	Joe Bendik	31	0	27+0	0	4+0	0
13	DF	(Scotland) SCO	Steven Caldwell	24	0	21+0	0	3+0	0
14	MF	(Canada) CAN	Dwayne De Rosario	23	1	4+15	1	1+3	0
15	DF	(Canada) CAN	Doneil Henry	25	3	19+2	1	4+0	2
16	DF	(England) ENG	Bradley Orr	21	1	14+5	1	2+0	0
17	DF	(United States) USA	Nick Hagglund	27	2	23+2	2	2+0	0
18	FW	(England) ENG	Jermain Defoe	21	12	17+2	11	2+0	1
21	MF	(Canada) CAN	Jonathan Osorio	29	3	24+3	3	1+1	0
22	FW	(Canada) CAN	Jordan Hamilton	1	0	0+1	0	0+0	0
23	FW	(Ghana) GHA	Dominic Oduro	24	2	17+7	2	0+0	0
25	MF	(United States) USA	Jeremy Hall	5	0	2+1	0	2+0	0
26	MF	(United States) USA	Collen Warner	20	0	19+1	0	0+0	0
27	FW	(England) ENG	Luke Moore	29	6	22+5	6	2+0	0
28	DF	(United States) USA	Mark Bloom	29	0	26+0	0	2+1	0
32	FW	(United States) USA	Andrew Wiedeman	8	0	0+7	0	0+1	0
33	DF	(United States) USA	Ryan Richter	0	0	0+0	0	0+0	0
35	MF	(United States) USA	Daniel Lovitz	21	0	5+13	0	2+1	0
40	GK	(Canada) CAN	Quillan Roberts	0	0	0+0	0	0+0	0
Players who left after the start of the season.
20	MF	(Canada) CAN	Issey Nakajima-Farran	7	2	2+3	2	2+0	0
23	MF	(Spain) ESP	Álvaro Rey	7	0	6+1	0	0+0	0
30	GK	(Brazil) BRA	Júlio César	7	0	7+0	0	0+0	0

=== Goals and assists ===
Correct as of October 25, 2014

Goals
Pos.	Playing Pos.	Nation	Name	Major League Soccer	Canadian Championship	Total
1	FW	(England)	Jermain Defoe	11	1	12
2	FW	(Brazil)	Gilberto	7	–	7
3	FW	(England)	Luke Moore	6	–	6
4	MF	(Brazil)	Jackson	4	–	4
5	MF	(United States)	Michael Bradley	2	1	3
5	DF	(Canada)	Doneil Henry	1	2	3
5	MF	(Canada)	Jonathan Osorio	3	–	3
8	DF	(United States)	Nick Hagglund	2	–	2
8	MF	(Canada)	Issey Nakajima-Farran	2	–	2
8	FW	(Ghana)	Dominic Oduro	2	–	2
11	MF	(United States)	Warren Creavalle	1	–	1
11	FW	(Canada)	Dwayne De Rosario	1	–	1
11	DF	(England)	Bradley Orr	1	–	1
Total				43	4	47

Assists
Pos.	Playing Pos.	Nation	Name	Major League Soccer	Canadian Championship	Total
1	FW	(Brazil)	Gilberto	5	1	6
2	FW	(Ghana)	Dominic Oduro	5	–	5
3	MF	(United States)	Michael Bradley	4	–	4
3	FW	(England)	Luke Moore	4	–	4
3	MF	(Canada)	Jonathan Osorio	4	–	4
6	FW	(England)	Jermain Defoe	2	1	3
6	DF	(United States)	Nick Hagglund	3	–	3
6	MF	(United States)	Daniel Lovitz	2	1	3
6	DF	(United States)	Justin Morrow	3	–	3
10	MF	(United States)	Collen Warner	2	–	2
11	DF	(United States)	Mark Bloom	1	–	1
11	MF	(Brazil)	Jackson	1	–	1
11	DF	(England)	Bradley Orr	1	–	1
Total				37	3	40

=== Clean sheets ===
Correct as of October 25, 2014

R	Pos	Nat	Name	Major League Soccer	Canadian Championship	Total
1	GK	(United States)	Joe Bendik	4	–	4
2	GK	(Brazil)	Júlio César	2	–	2
			TOTALS	6	–	6

=== Disciplinary record ===
Correct as of October 25, 2014

No.	Pos.	Name	MLS		Canadian Championship		Total	
No.	Pos.	Name	Yellow card	Red card	Yellow card	Red card	Yellow card	Red card
2	DF	(United States) Justin Morrow	6	0	0	0	6	0
3	DF	(United States) Warren Creavalle	1	0	0	0	1	0
4	MF	(United States) Michael Bradley	6	0	1	0	7	0
8	MF	(Canada) Kyle Bekker	1	0	1	0	2	0
9	FW	(Brazil) Gilberto	3	0	0	0	3	0
11	MF	(Brazil) Jackson	5	1	0	0	5	1
12	GK	(United States) Joe Bendik	2	0	0	0	2	0
13	DF	(Scotland) Steven Caldwell	3	1	0	0	3	1
14	FW	(Canada) Dwayne De Rosario	1	0	1	0	2	0
15	DF	(Canada) Doneil Henry	8	0	1	0	9	0
16	DF	(England) Bradley Orr	1	0	1	0	2	0
17	DF	(United States) Nick Hagglund	2	2	0	0	2	2
18	FW	(England) Jermain Defoe	5	0	0	0	5	0
20	MF	(Canada) Issey Nakajima-Farran	1	0	0	0	1	0
21	MF	(Canada) Jonathan Osorio	1	1	0	0	1	1
23	MF	(Spain) Álvaro Rey	1	0	1	0	2	0
23	FW	(Ghana) Dominic Oduro	2	0	0	0	2	0
26	MF	(United States) Collen Warner	3	0	0	0	3	0
27	FW	(England) Luke Moore	2	1	0	0	2	1
28	DF	(United States) Mark Bloom	2	0	1	0	3	0
30	GK	(Brazil) Júlio César	1	0	0	0	1	0
35	MF	(United States) Daniel Lovitz	2	0	0	0	2	0
Total			59	6	7	0	66	6
