= Justin Morrow =

American soccer player

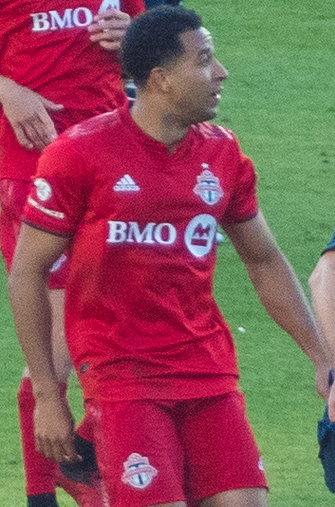
- Morrow with Toronto FC in 2020

Personal information
- Full name: Justin Morrow
- Date of birth: October 4, 1987 (age 39)
- Place of birth: Cleveland, Ohio, United States
- Height: 5 ft 9 in (1.75 m)
- Position: Full-back

College career
Years	Team	Apps	(Gls)
2006–2009	Notre Dame Fighting Irish	89	(7)

Senior career*
Years	Team	Apps	(Gls)
2007	Indiana Invaders	8	(1)
2008	Cleveland Internationals	14	(11)
2009	Chicago Fire Premier	15	(1)
2010–2013	San Jose Earthquakes	71	(2)
2010	→ FC Tampa Bay (loan)	5	(0)
2011	→ FC Tampa Bay (loan)	2	(0)
2014–2021	Toronto FC	207	(17)
Total		322	(32)

International career
2013–2018	United States	4	(0)
Medal record
Representing United States
Men's soccer
CONCACAF Gold Cup
Winner	2017 United States
- * Club domestic league appearances and goals

Justin Morrow (born October 4, 1987) is an American former professional soccer player who played as a defender. Morrow is the executive director of Black Players for Change, which in 2020 won the MLS Humanitarian of the Year Award.

== College and amateur career ==
Morrow attended Saint Ignatius High School, where he was an adidas/NSCAA high school All-American.

He played college soccer at the University of Notre Dame. He was a Big East Academic All-Star in both his sophomore and junior years as well as his team's captain during his senior season. He made 89 appearances and scored seven goals during his college career.

While in college, Morrow also played for the Indiana Invaders, the Cleveland Internationals, and the Chicago Fire Premier in the USL Premier Development League. During the 2009 season he helped the Fire to the 2009 PDL championship game.

== Club career ==
=== San Jose Earthquakes ===
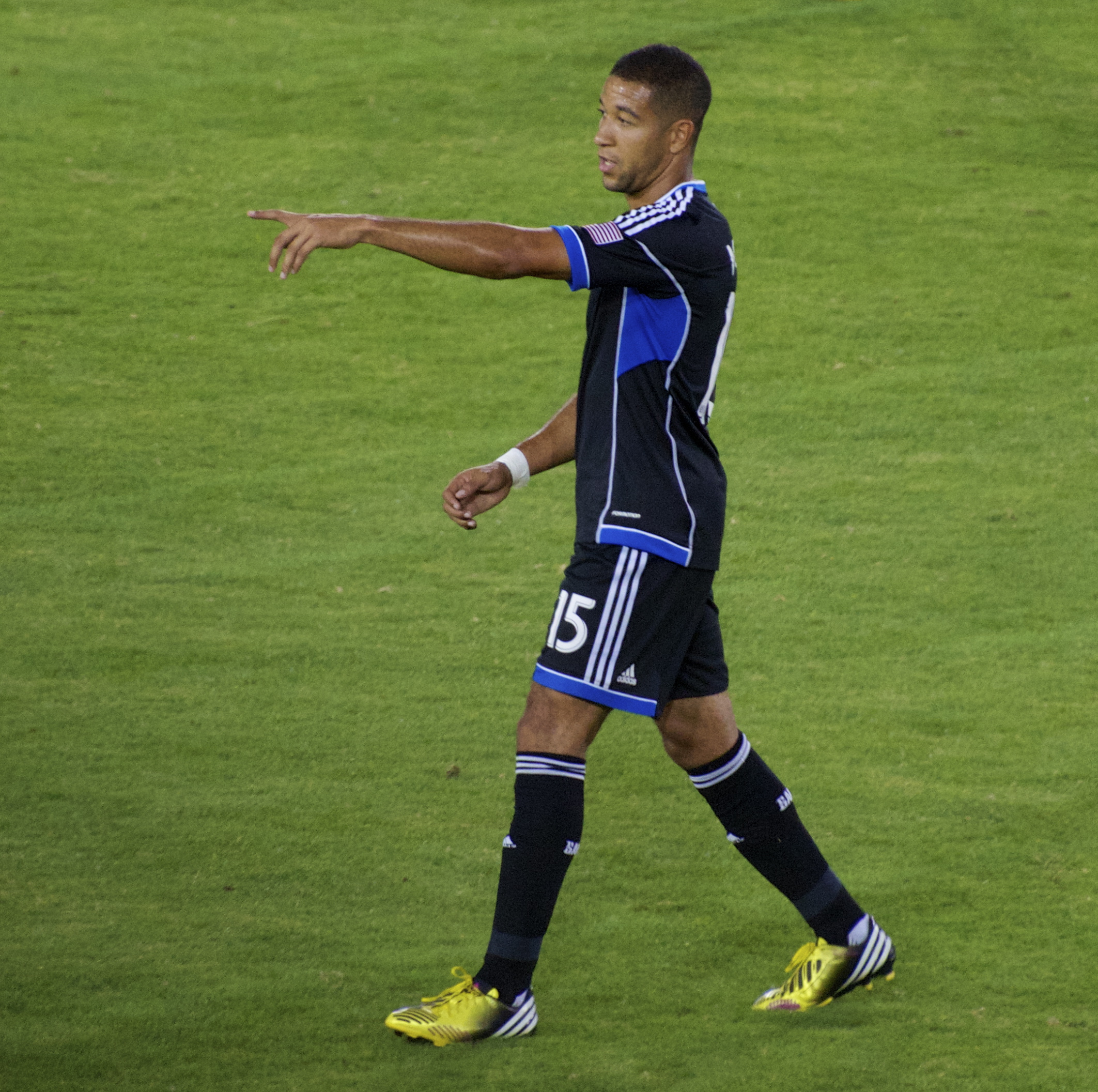
Justin Morrow with the San Jose Earthquakes in 2013

Morrow was drafted in the second round, 28th overall, of the 2010 MLS SuperDraft by the San Jose Earthquakes.

Morrow made his professional debut and scored his first goal on April 14, 2010, in a U.S. Open Cup game against Real Salt Lake. He made his MLS debut on May 1, 2010, against the Colorado Rapids.

After struggling to break in the first XI, Morrow was sent on loan to USSF Division 2 club FC Tampa Bay on September 7, 2010. He returned to the San Jose roster for the start of the 2011 season but was again loaned to FC Tampa Bay on July 14, 2011. This loan was short-lived as Morrow was recalled to San Jose on July 25, 2011.

Morrow broke out in 2012, starting 33 matches as the Earthquakes were surprise Supporters' Shield winners. He was named to his first All-Star game.

=== Toronto FC ===
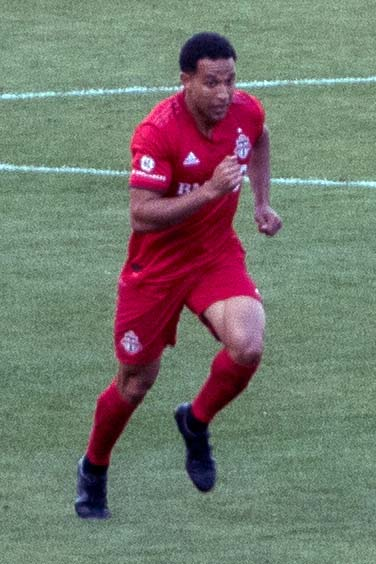
Justin Morrow playing for Toronto FC in 2020

He was traded to Toronto FC following the 2013 season. Morrow recalled learning of the trade while at his own destination wedding in South America, having briefly turned his phone back on to check emails and finding a short message from Earthquakes general manager John Doyle asking him to call. He said that because Toronto FC had a poor reputation for roster and coaching turnover at the time, his initial reaction to the news was fear that the move could effectively end his career within two years, prompting him to call his agent to see if the trade could be stopped. He has said he was ultimately reassured by former San Jose teammates with prior ties to Toronto FC, including Alan Gordon, Dan Gargan, Sam Cronin and Nana Attakora, who told him the club was well-run and that he would enjoy playing there. Morrow has said that he and his wife, Jimena, arrived in Toronto with no children and grew to love the city during the 2014 FIFA World Cup, describing the atmosphere of fans gathering at bars and driving with flags displayed as something he had not experienced growing up in Cleveland. He has said that, even after a difficult first season on the pitch, he decided he wanted to do everything possible to win with the club, remain in Toronto long-term and raise a family there. Toronto FC blog Waking the Red named Morrow the team's MVP for the 2014 season.

On December 10, 2016, following a 0–0 draw against Seattle Sounders FC in the 2016 MLS Cup Final at BMO Field, Morrow missed Toronto's sixth penalty in the resulting shoot-out, which allowed Román Torres to clinch the title for Seattle after netting the subsequent spot kick.

In the 2017 MLS regular season, Morrow scored his first career hat-trick in the club's 4–2 home win against New York Red Bulls on September 30, 2017, which earned Toronto FC their first ever Supporters' Shield. Reflecting on the 2017 season, in which Toronto FC won MLS's first-ever domestic treble, Morrow has described as the finest individual campaign of his career, and said he came to view New Year's Eve heading into 2018, spent with his family in South America, as a moment where he sensed he would never again match that year's highs, calling it "the final moment" of his professional peak. He has said he regards his personal development during that period as inseparable from the club's own growth in stature, saying the two "grew together."

On February 23, 2021, Morrow re-signed with Toronto FC.

On September 16, 2021, Toronto FC announced that Morrow will retire from professional soccer following the 2021 season. He played his final match on November 7, 2021, against D.C. United, being given the captain's armband for the match and substituted out in stoppage time to a standing ovation from the crowd. Surrounding his retirement, Morrow said he hoped to be remembered as someone who "did more than help the team win," saying he viewed a player's on-field contributions and off-field conduct as inseparable, and stressed that habits built in day-to-day training, rather than isolated moments on game day, form the foundation of sustained success.

== International career ==
Following his successful 2012 MLS season, Morrow was called up to the national team for the first time. He started in a draw against Canada in a January 2013 friendly. He was an unused sub in two 2014 World Cup qualifiers against Costa Rica and Mexico in March 2013. Morrow would return to the national team in 2017, being named to the 2017 CONCACAF Gold Cup roster. He would earn his second cap with the squad, starting and playing the full 90 minutes, in the U.S.'s second match of the tournament versus Martinique, which ended in a 3–2 win.

== Personal life ==
Speaking to DARBY about founding what became Black Players for Change on Juneteenth 2020 in the wake of the killing of George Floyd, Morrow said the effort "felt necessary" and described the experience of organizing alongside fellow Black players as cathartic, comparing the sense of unity to what he had previously only felt while working toward championships as a teammate. He has said the coalition grew into a nonprofit with more than 170 members, and that under his leadership it raised over $1 million and helped build more than a dozen mini-pitches across the United States aimed at expanding access to the sport for Black youth. Reflecting on how he wants to be remembered, Morrow said that his goal is to be seen as someone who left a positive impact, saying he believes people generally have a limited time to serve as stewards of the world and should aim to leave it better for future generations rather than prioritize personal accumulation.

== Career statistics ==
=== Club ===
Appearances and goals by club, season and competition
Club	Season	League			Playoffs		National cup (Note: Includes U.S. Open Cup and Canadian Championship matches.)		Continental (Note: Includes CONCACAF Champions League and Campeones Cup matches.)		Total	
Club	Season	Division	Apps	Goals	Apps	Goals	Apps	Goals	Apps	Goals	Apps	Goals
Indiana Invaders	2007	PDL	8	1	—		—		—		8	1
Cleveland Internationals	2008	PDL	14	11	—		—		—		14	11
Chicago Fire Premier	2009	PDL	15	1	—		—		—		15	1
San Jose Earthquakes	2010	MLS	3	0	0	0	0	0	—		3	0
San Jose Earthquakes	2011	MLS	9	0	—		0	0	—		9	0
San Jose Earthquakes	2012	MLS	33	1	2	0	2	0	—		37	1
San Jose Earthquakes	2013	MLS	26	1	—		1	0	4	0	31	1
San Jose Earthquakes	Total		71	2	2	0	3	0	4	0	80	2
FC Tampa Bay (loan)	2010	D2 Pro League	5	0	—		0	0	—		5	0
FC Tampa Bay (loan)	2011	NASL	2	0	—		0	0	—		2	0
Toronto FC	2014	MLS	31	0	—		3	0	—		34	0
Toronto FC	2015	MLS	32	2	1	0	2	0	—		35	2
Toronto FC	2016	MLS	31	5	6	0	3	0	—		40	5
Toronto FC	2017	MLS	28	8	5	0	3	0	—		36	8
Toronto FC	2018	MLS	21	1	—		4	0	6	0	31	1
Toronto FC	2019	MLS	28	1	4	0	4	0	2	0	38	1
Toronto FC	2020	MLS	15 (Note: Includes one appearance in the MLS is Back Tournament group stage.)	0	0	0	0	0	—		15	0
Toronto FC	2021	MLS	21	0	—		1	0	3	1	25	1
Toronto FC	Total		207	17	16	0	20	0	11	1	254	18
Career total			322	32	18	0	23	0	15	1	378	33

=== International ===
Appearances and goals by national team and year
National team	Year	Apps	Goals
United States	2013	1	0
United States	2017	2	0
United States	2018	1	0
Total		4	0

== Honors ==
San Jose Earthquakes

- Supporters' Shield: 2012

Toronto FC

- MLS Cup: 2017; Runner-up 2016, 2019
- Supporters' Shield: 2017
- Canadian Championship: 2016, 2017, 2018; Runner-up 2019
- CONCACAF Champions League: Runner-up 2018
- Eastern Conference winners (playoffs): 2016, 2017, 2019

United States

- CONCACAF Gold Cup: 2017

Individual

- MLS All-Star: 2012
- MLS Best XI: 2017
- MLS Humanitarian of the Year Award: 2021
