= Doneil Henry =

Canadian soccer player (born 1993)

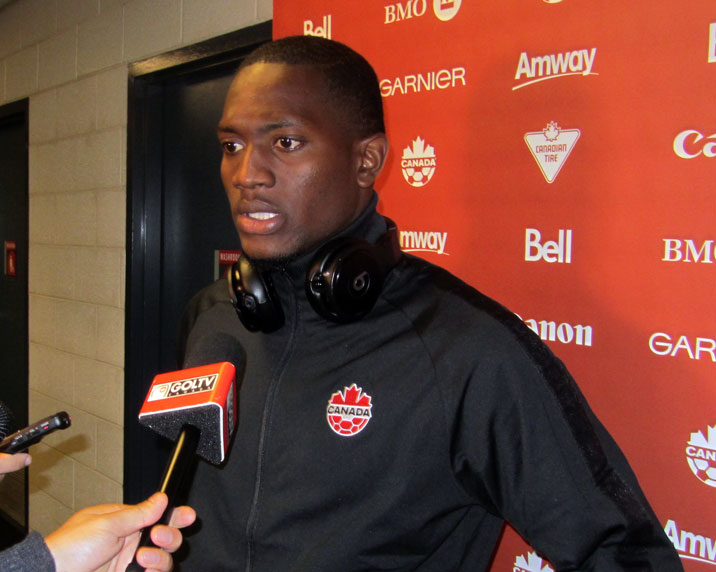
- Henry in 2014

Personal information
- Full name: Doneil Jor-Dee Ashley Henry
- Date of birth: April 20, 1993 (age 33)
- Place of birth: Brampton, Ontario, Canada
- Height: 1.88 m (6 ft 2 in)
- Position: Centre-back

Youth career
- Brampton Youth SC
- North Mississauga SC
- 2008–2010: Toronto FC

Senior career*
Years	Team	Apps	(Gls)
2010–2014	Toronto FC	49	(1)
2014–2015	Apollon Limassol	0	(0)
2014	→ Toronto FC (loan)	21	(1)
2015–2017	West Ham United	0	(0)
2015–2016	→ Blackburn Rovers (loan)	4	(0)
2016	→ AC Horsens (loan)	4	(0)
2017–2019	Vancouver Whitecaps FC	39	(4)
2018	→ Ottawa Fury (loan)	3	(0)
2019–2022	Suwon Samsung Bluewings	41	(3)
2022	Los Angeles FC	5	(0)
2022	Toronto FC	7	(0)
2023	Minnesota United	0	(0)
2023	→ Minnesota United 2 (loan)	1	(0)
2023	HFX Wanderers	13	(0)
Total		187	(9)

International career^{‡}
2010–2013	Canada U20	6	(0)
2012	Canada U23	3	(1)
2012–2022	Canada	44	(1)

Managerial career
- 2024–2025: Simcoe County Rovers FC (sporting director, head coach)
- 2025: Canada U17 (assistant coach)
- 2026: Canada B (assistant coach)
- 2026–: Toronto FC (advisor)
- * Club domestic league appearances and goals as of June 3, 2024 ‡ National team caps and goals as of June 3, 2024

Doneil Henry (born April 20, 1993) is a Canadian soccer coach and former professional soccer player. He currently serves as a special advisor for player development and engagement of MLS club Toronto FC.

A product of the Toronto FC Academy, Henry became the club's first-ever homegrown signing in 2010 and went on to be the first Toronto FC academy player sold for a transfer fee, joining Cypriot side Apollon Limassol in 2013 before moving to Premier League club West Ham United later that year. He spent the following decade on loan and permanent moves through Blackburn Rovers, AC Horsens and Vancouver Whitecaps FC, before a spell in South Korea with Suwon Samsung Bluewings and a return to Major League Soccer with Los Angeles FC and Minnesota United; he closed out his club career at HFX Wanderers FC in the Canadian Premier League, retiring in February 2025.

Henry represented Canada at senior level from 2012 to 2021, earning 44 caps and appearing at multiple editions of the CONCACAF Gold Cup and CONCACAF Nations League, and was part of the squad that secured Canada's qualification for the 2022 FIFA World Cup before a late injury ruled him out of the final tournament roster.

== Club career ==
=== Early career ===
Henry's parents, Beverly and Menocal Henry, moved to Canada from Jamaica. He started playing soccer at age 10 and played youth soccer with the Brampton Youth Soccer Club and North Mississauga SC. Henry has said he was cut from a provincial team around age 16 and feared his football career was over before Toronto FC's academy came calling, adding that the club "saved my life" at a time when he had no interest in pursuing his Princeton offers and only wanted to become a professional footballer.< He has recalled the demands of academy life, including having to catch the GO Train to training by 6:10 or 6:15 each morning alongside a small group of teammates that dwindled over time until he was making the commute alone.

=== Toronto FC ===
Henry joined the Toronto FC Academy in November 2008, and captained the team through two seasons in the Canadian Soccer League in 2009 and 2010. He appeared for Toronto FC in the 2010 Nutrilite Canadian Championship against the Vancouver Whitecaps and a 2010–11 CONCACAF Champions League qualifying match against Motagua. He also made his MLS debut and played in another 2010–11 CONCACAF Champions League match against Árabe Unido during the 2010 season. He also played in an international friendly against Bolton Wanderers. He signed with Toronto FC on August 26, 2010, becoming the first TFC Academy player to sign for the first team. Henry has credited former Toronto FC and Canadian international midfielder Julian De Guzman with mentoring him as a teenager in the first team's dressing room, saying De Guzman helped shape his understanding of professionalism and his respect for the game. He has said that a man-of-the-match performance in the club's friendly against Bolton Wanderers proved to be a turning point, and that Toronto FC's Earl Cochrane presented him with his first professional contract at his home the following day.

On June 15, 2011, in a 0–0 away draw against New England Revolution, Henry drew high praise from Taylor Twellman who was commentating on the game. After coming on for Richard Eckersley in the second half against Real Salt Lake on April 28, 2012, he scored his first goal for Toronto in the 77th minute in a 3–2 away defeat. On August 21, the club announced that it had re-signed him to a long-term deal. During the 2011–12 CONCACAF Champions League, he made four appearances during the 2011 season and an appearance during the 2012 season. He also made two appearances in the 2012–13 CONCACAF Champions League during the 2012 season.

Henry scored his second goal for Toronto outside the penalty box in a 2–0 home victory over rival Montreal Impact in the Canadian Championship on April 24, 2013. Prior to the 2014 season, he spent some time training with Premier League side West Ham United. After scoring mid-week in the Canadian Championship against Montreal Impact, he scored the 92nd-minute game winner against Columbus Crew in a 3–2 home victory May 31, 2014.

=== Apollon Limassol ===
Henry was sold to 2014–15 UEFA Europa League and Cypriot First Division participants Apollon Limassol, for an undisclosed fee in April 2014 prior to the commencement of the 2014 MLS season. Founded in 1954 and based in Limassol, Apollon competed in the group stage of the 2014–15 UEFA Europa League during Henry's time with the club. Toronto FC confirmed that the deal had a sell-on clause and they intended to enter into talks with Henry and Apollon Limassol with hope of keeping him on loan again for the 2015 MLS season. Henry never made a competitive appearance for Apollon, remaining on loan with Toronto FC for the 2014 season before completing his move to West Ham United the following year. Henry has pointed to this transfer as a career milestone, noting that it made him the first Toronto FC academy player both signed by the club and later sold for a transfer fee.

=== West Ham United ===
Having previously had two training stints with West Ham in the Premier League after the player was recommended to manager Sam Allardyce by Ryan Nelsen, Henry signed for the club on January 3, 2015, on a "long term" contract for an undisclosed fee. Henry has described the ordeal of finally joining the club as, in his words, "heartbreaking": an initial training stint that was only supposed to last ten days went so well that West Ham wanted to sign him within the week, but a work permit denial delayed the transfer by roughly a year until an appeal succeeded. He has spoken candidly about struggling with homesickness once the move became permanent, saying that although he considered himself unshakeable, going without playing for his first four to six months in England left him second-guessing himself in ways he hadn't experienced while still living at home with his parents during his time at Toronto FC. He made his West Ham debut on August 6, 2015, in a 2–1 away defeat to Romanian side FC Astra in the Europa League qualifying stages. His team was eliminated as a result of the defeat. This was his only appearance and he left the club in December 2017 when his contract was cancelled by mutual consent.

==== Loans to Blackburn Rovers ====
On March 4, Henry was loaned by West Ham to Blackburn Rovers in the Football League Championship, on a one-month loan. He made his debut on the same day against Sheffield Wednesday, a 2–1 win for Rovers, a performance described by Rovers' manager, Gary Bowyer as "magnificent". Henry has recalled that this loan spell began so abruptly he only had time to collect his kit and meet his new teammates before playing that same evening, without a prior training session with the squad. In his second match for Blackburn on March 11, he got an assist in a 94th-minute goal from Jordan Rhodes to give them a 1–0 victory over Bolton Wanderers. In his third game for Blackburn, a 3–1 away win against Charlton Athletic, he sustained a hamstring injury that ended his season. With his loan cut short, he returned to West Ham United. Henry has said the injury shifted perceptions of him in English football, from doubts about his ability to concerns about his durability, in his words: "it was that Doneil was never able to stay fit long enough." He returned to Blackburn on loan on November 24, 2015.

==== Loan to AC Horsens ====
On August 31, 2016, Henry was loaned by West Ham to Danish Superliga club AC Horsens for half a season. On October 23 Henry started his first game in the starting line-up, against Randers FC. The game resulted in a clean sheet and 1–0 victory for Horsens and Henry. In Henry's second start with Horsens, he suffered an ACL tear, which would end his season. He went back to West Ham in start of January 2017. Henry has said that his spell at AC Horsens, was marked by further injuries that limited his ability to build momentum in his career.

=== Vancouver Whitecaps FC ===
On December 22, 2017, Henry was signed by Vancouver Whitecaps FC. On April 25, 2018, Henry was loaned to United Soccer League club Ottawa Fury until the end of May. According to Vancouver Whitecaps FC head coach Carl Robinson, the goal of the loan was to help Henry reach full fitness by getting competitive match time. Henry made three appearances for Ottawa, all clean sheets, but was forced to sit out the last two games of his loan, one due to bronchitis and one due to fatigue. On May 29, he was reported to have returned to Vancouver. Henry made his Whitecaps debut in June 2018, shortly after returning from Ottawa Fury on loan.

He scored his first league goal for Vancouver against Minnesota United in Vancouver's 2019 MLS season opener on March 2.

Over two seasons with Vancouver, Henry made 42 appearances, including 25 league matches in 2019, and scored four goals in 2019; he has said this period allowed him to "find his footing again in Vancouver" after several years of minimal playing time in Europe.

=== Suwon Samsung Bluewings ===
On November 20, 2019, Henry was transferred to South Korean K League side Suwon Samsung Bluewings for an undisclosed fee. Henry has described the move as "another fresh start" in his career, saying that playing in South Korea has been "a blessing when it comes to travelling and going to different parts of the world" and that he has met great people and enjoyed the chance to learn about their culture. He made his debut for Suwon in the AFC Champions League, starting in a group stage match against Vissel Kobe on February 19, 2020. Henry scored his first goal for the club on October 31, netting the opener in a 2–1 victory over Gangwon FC.

=== Los Angeles FC ===
In February 2022, Henry returned to MLS, signing with Los Angeles FC. On February 26, Henry made his debut with the club during LAFC's 3–0 win over the Colorado Rapids. Henry came into the match at the 86th minute as a substitute for Jesús Murillo. On July 3, 2022, after only appearing in 6 matches, Henry was waived by the club.

=== Return to Toronto FC ===
On July 22, 2022, Henry returned to his former club Toronto FC, signing a six-month deal through the end of 2022. He made his re-debut for Toronto the next day against Charlotte FC. After the end of the 2022 season, he departed the club, upon the expiry of his contract.

=== Minnesota United ===
In December 2022, Minnesota United announced they had claimed Henry off waivers for the 2023 season.

=== HFX Wanderers ===
In July 2023, he signed a contract with the HFX Wanderers FC of the Canadian Premier League for the remainder of the 2023 season, with an option for the 2024 season. He made his debut for the Wanderers on July 23, subbing into their match against Atlético Ottawa late into the second-half of an eventual 1-0 victory.

== International career ==
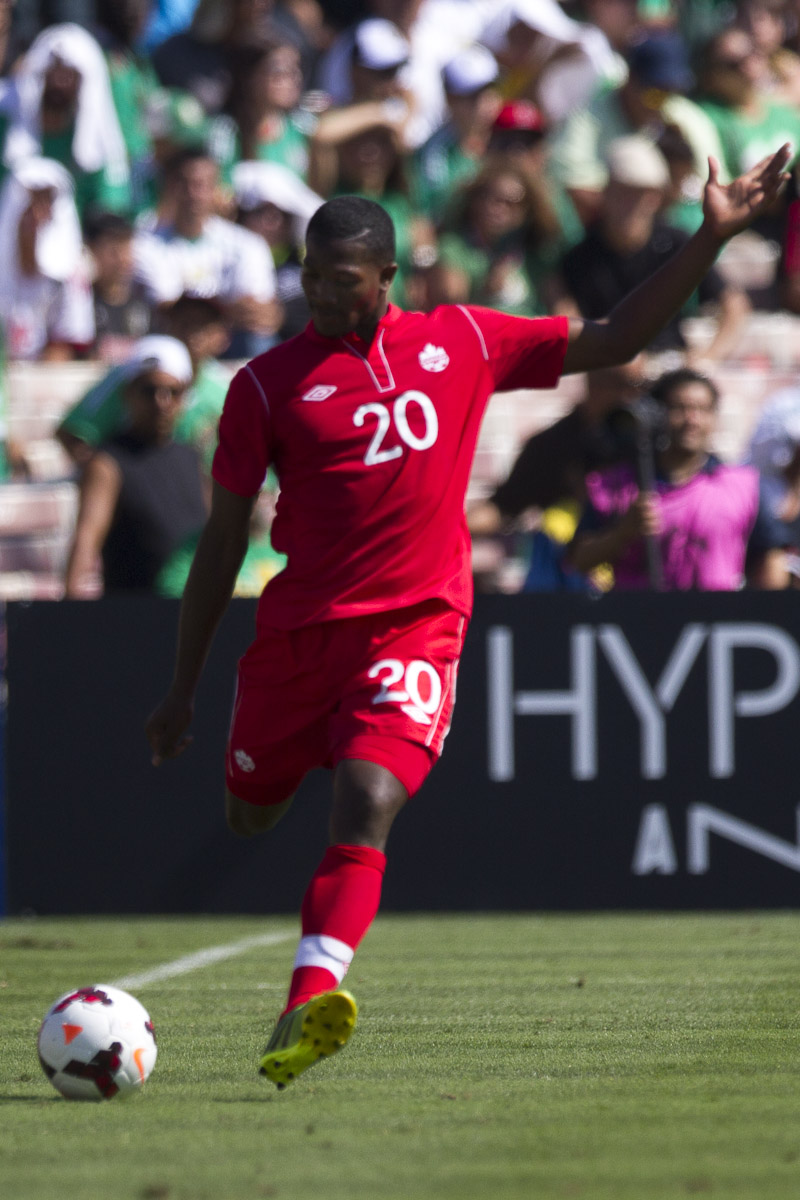
Henry with Canada at the 2013 CONCACAF Gold Cup

=== Youth ===
Henry played three matches for the Canada U-20 men's national soccer team.

He was selected for the Canada U23 roster to partake in the 2012 CONCACAF Men's Olympic Qualifying Tournament. After sitting out the first game, he started and scoring the opening goal against the United States U23 as part of a 2–0 victory for Canada.

=== Senior ===
Henry earned his first cap for Canada's senior team August 15, 2012, in a friendly against Trinidad and Tobago under head coach Stephen Hart. He started the match before being subbed out at halftime for Pedro Pacheco, the game ended in a 2–0 victory. On December 10, 2012, he was awarded the 2012 Canadian U-20 Player of the Year, receiving 37.8% of the vote and just beating out Samuel Piette for the award.

On June 27, 2013, Henry was listed as a part of the confirmed 23-man squad for Colin Miller's Canada squad for 2013 CONCACAF Gold Cup.

Henry was named to the squad for the 2019 CONCACAF Gold Cup on May 30, 2019. He scored his first goal for Canada on September 7, 2019, against Cuba in a CONCACAF Nations League match. Henry was named to the squad for the 2021 CONCACAF Gold Cup on July 1, 2021.

Henry was expected to be named to the Canada squad for the 2022 FIFA World Cup, but during the warm-up prior to a pre-tournament friendly against Bahrain on November 11, he suffered a calf injury that ultimately ruled him out of the final squad.

Henry has described his roughly decade-long international career as coinciding with a marked cultural shift within the national team, saying that "the team is night and day, like the mentality of the professionals, the players, the quality, the preparation with everything that's going on." He has credited a generation of players — including Jonathan Osorio, who he says bridges the gap between veterans such as Atiba Hutchinson and younger players like Alphonso Davies — with installing a "brotherhood" mentality within the squad, and has singled out head coach John Herdman as "the leader of everything that goes on" in transforming the team's culture and style of play. Henry has said that senior players on the squad, including himself, deliberately avoid imposing strict controls on younger teammates so as not to hinder their development, explaining that "we don't put the fear, or the control, or the locks on them to stop them from growing."

== Coaching and executive career ==
In December 2021, he was announced as a co-owner of expansion League1 Ontario club Simcoe County Rovers FC. Henry joined the ownership group alongside former Toronto FC teammate and mentor Julian De Guzman, the club's President and Managing Partner, as well as fellow Canadian international Cyle Larin. Discussing the club's future, Henry has stated his clear ambition for Simcoe County Rovers to eventually join the Canadian Premier League and compete at that level, saying his ownership group intends to build the club's grassroots foundation using lessons learned from their own playing careers about what separates successful teams from unsuccessful ones. In June 2024, he was named the Sporting Director of the club. Shortly thereafter, he was named as the head coach, following the firing of the regular head coach. For the 2025 season, Henry remained the Rovers' head coach and sporting director. Henry resigned from Simcoe County Rovers FC in December 2025, ahead of his move to the professional coaching ranks.

Henry made his international coaching debut as an assistant coach with Canada's U17 men's national team at the 4 Nations Tournament in Mexico. Henry made his senior international coaching debut with Canada as an assistant coach in a friendly versus Guatemala on January 17, 2026 in Los Angeles; Canada beat Guatemala 1–0.

== Career statistics ==
=== Club ===
As of match played October 14, 2023

Club	Season	League			Playoffs		National Cup		Continental		Total	
Club	Season	Division	Apps	Goals	Apps	Goals	Apps	Goals	Apps	Goals	Apps	Goals
Toronto FC	2010	Major League Soccer	1	0	—		1	0	2 (Note: Appearances in the CONCACAF Champions League.)	0	4	0
Toronto FC	2011	Major League Soccer	10	0	—		1	0	4	0	15	0
Toronto FC	2012	Major League Soccer	18	1	—		4	0	3	0	25	1
Toronto FC	2013	Major League Soccer	20	0	—		2	1	—		22	1
Toronto FC	2014	Major League Soccer	21	1	—		4	2	—		25	3
Toronto FC	Total		70	2	0	0	12	3	11	0	93	5
West Ham United	2015–16	Premier League	0	0	—		0	0	1 (Note: Appearances in the UEFA Europa League.)	0	1	0
Blackburn Rovers (loan)	2014–15	Championship	3	0	—		0	0	—		3	0
Blackburn Rovers (loan)	2015–16	Championship	1	0	—		0	0	—		1	0
Blackburn Rovers (loan)	Total		4	0	0	0	0	0	0	0	0	0
AC Horsens (loan)	2016–17	Danish Superliga	4	0	—		0	0	—		4	0
Vancouver Whitecaps FC	2018	Major League Soccer	14	0	—		1	0	—		15	0
Vancouver Whitecaps FC	2019	Major League Soccer	25	4	—		2	0	—		27	4
Vancouver Whitecaps FC	Total		39	4	0	0	3	0	0	0	42	4
Ottawa Fury (loan)	2018	USL	3	0	—		0	0	—		3	0
Suwon Samsung Bluewings	2020	K League 1	20	1	—		2	0	2	0	24	1
Suwon Samsung Bluewings	2021	K League 1	21	2	—		1	0	0	0	22	2
Suwon Samsung Bluewings	Total		41	2	0	0	3	0	2	0	46	3
Los Angeles FC	2022	Major League Soccer	5	0	0	0	1	0	—		6	0
Toronto FC	2022	Major League Soccer	7	0	—		1	0	—		8	0
Minnesota United FC	2023	Major League Soccer	0	0	0	0	0	0	—		0	0
Minnesota United FC 2 (loan)	2023	MLS Next Pro	1	0	0	0	—		—		1	0
HFX Wanderers FC	2023	Canadian Premier League	13	0	1	0	0	0	—		14	0
Career total			187	9	1	0	20	3	14	0	222	12

=== International ===
As of match played June 13, 2022

Canada
Year	Apps	Goals
2012	1	0
2013	10	0
2014	3	0
2015	0	0
2016	8	0
2017	0	0
2018	2	0
2019	7	1
2020	0	0
2021	10	0
2022	3	0
Total	44	1

==== International goals ====
Scores and results list Canada's goal tally first.

No.	Date	Venue	Cap	Opponent	Score	Result	Competition
1.	September 7, 2019	BMO Field, Toronto, Canada	29	Cuba	5–0	6–0	2019–20 CONCACAF Nations League A

== Honours ==
Toronto FC

- Canadian Championship: 2010, 2011, 2012

Individual

- Canadian U-20 Players of the Year: 2012
