= List of Toronto FC seasons =

This is an summary of seasons played by Toronto FC in Major League Soccer and other soccer competitions, from its inaugural MLS campaign in 2007 to the completion of the 2026 season. Friendly matches and competitions are excluded.

== Key ==
Key to competitions

- Major League Soccer (MLS) – The top-flight of soccer in the United States, established in 1996.
- Canadian Championship (CC) – The premier knockout cup competition in Canadian soccer, first contested in 2008.

Key to colours and symbols

1st or W	Winners
2nd or RU	Runners-up
3rd	Third place
Last	Wooden Spoon
♦	MLS Golden Boot
	Highest average attendance
Italics	Ongoing competition

Key to league record

- Season = The year and article of the season
- Div = Division/level on pyramid
- League = League name
- Pld = Games played
- W = Games won
- L = Games lost
- D = Games drawn
- GF = Goals for
- GA = Goals against
- GD = Goal difference
- Pts = Points
- PPG = Points per game
- Conf. = Conference position
- Overall = League position

Key to cup record

- DNE = Did not enter
- DNQ = Did not qualify
- NH = Competition not held or cancelled
- QR = Qualifying round
- PR = Preliminary round
- GS = Group stage
- R1 = First round
- R2 = Second round
- R3 = Third round
- R4 = Fourth round
- R5 = Fifth round
- Ro32 = Round of 32
- Ro16 = Round of 16
- QF = Quarter-finals
- SF = Semi-finals
- F = Final
- RU = Runners-up
- W = Winners

== Seasons ==
Season	League										Position		Playoffs	CC	Other	International		Average attendance	Top goalscorer(s)	
Season	Division	Pld	W	L	D	GF	GA	GD	Pts	PPG	Conf.	Overall	Playoffs	CC	Other	International		Average attendance	Player(s)	Goals
2007	MLS	30	6	17	7	25	49	–24	25	0.83	7th	13th	DNQ	–	–	DNE		20,130	(England) Danny Dichio	6
2008	MLS	30	9	13	8	34	43	–9	35	1.17	7th	12th	DNQ	RU	–	DNQ		20,120	(England) Rohan Ricketts	6
2009	MLS	30	10	11	9	37	46	–9	39	1.30	5th	12th	DNQ	W	–	CONCACAF Champions League	PR	20,344	(Canada) Dwayne De Rosario	14
2010	MLS	30	9	13	8	33	41	–8	35	1.17	5th	11th	DNQ	W	–	CONCACAF Champions League	GS	20,453	(Canada) Dwayne De Rosario	17
2011	MLS	34	6	13	15	36	59	–23	33	0.97	8th	16th	DNQ	W	–	CONCACAF Champions League	SF	20,267	(Netherlands) Danny Koevermans	10
2012	MLS	34	5	21	8	36	62	–26	23	0.68	10th	19th	DNQ	W	–	CONCACAF Champions League	GS	18,155	(Jamaica) Ryan Johnson	12
2013	MLS	34	6	17	11	30	47	–17	29	0.85	9th	17th	DNQ	SF	–	DNQ		18,131	(Wales) Robert Earnshaw	8
2014	MLS	34	11	15	8	44	54	–10	41	1.21	7th	13th	DNQ	RU	–	DNQ		22,086	(England) Jermain Defoe	12
2015	MLS	34	15	15	4	58	58	+0	49	1.44	6th	12th	R1	SF	–	DNQ		23,451	(Italy) Sebastian Giovinco	23♦
2016	MLS	34	14	9	11	51	39	+12	53	1.56	3rd	5th	RU	W	–	DNQ		26,538	(Italy) Sebastian Giovinco	22
2017	MLS	34	20	5	9	74	37	+37	69	2.03	1st	1st	W	W	–	N/A		27,647	(Italy) Sebastian Giovinco	20
2018	MLS	34	10	18	6	59	64	–5	36	1.06	9th	19th	DNQ	W	–	CONCACAF Champions League Campeones Cup	RU RU	26,628	(Italy) Sebastian Giovinco	18
2019	MLS	34	13	10	11	57	52	+5	50	1.47	4th	9th	RU	RU	–	CONCACAF Champions League	Ro16	25,048	(Spain) Alejandro Pozuelo	14
2020	MLS	23	13	5	5	33	26	+7	44	1.91	2nd	2nd	R1	W	Ro16	Leagues Cup	NH	13,783	(Canada) Ayo Akinola (Spain) Alejandro Pozuelo	9
2021	MLS	34	6	18	10	39	66	−27	28	0.82	13th	26th	DNQ	RU	–	CONCACAF Champions League	QF	8,422	(Canada) Jonathan Osorio	6
2022	MLS	34	9	18	7	49	66	−17	34	1	13th	27th	DNQ	RU	–	DNQ		25,423	(Spain) Jesús Jiménez (Canada) Jonathan Osorio	10
2023	MLS	34	4	20	10	26	59	−33	22	0.65	15th	29th	DNQ	QF	–	Leagues Cup	GS	25,310	(Italy) Federico Bernardeschi (Italy) Lorenzo Insigne (Canada) Deandre Kerr	5
2024	MLS	34	11	19	4	40	61	−21	37	1.09	11th	22nd	DNQ	RU	–	Leagues Cup	Ro32	25,681	(Germany) Prince Owusu	12
2025	MLS	34	6	14	14	37	44	−7	32	0.94	12th	25th	DNQ	PR	–	DNQ		21,353	(Canada) Theo Corbeanu	7
2026	MLS	34	9	13	12	52	67	−15	39	1.15	12th	24th	DNQ	PR	–	DNQ		19,685	(United States) Josh Sargent	10
Total	–	653	192	284	177	850	1,040	–190	753	1.15	–	–	–	–	–	–		–	(Italy) Sebastian Giovinco	83

1. Average attendance include statistics from league matches only.
2. Top goalscorer(s) includes all goals scored in League, MLS Cup playoffs, Canadian Championship, Leagues Cup, MLS is Back Tournament, CONCACAF Champions Cup, FIFA Club World Cup, and other competitive continental matches.

== Yearly breakdown by competition ==
	Regular Season (Note: Includes MLS is Back Tournament group stage.)								Playoffs							Canadian Championship								Continental/Other (Note: Includes CONCACAF Champions Cup, Campeones Cup, Leagues Cup and MLS is Back Tournament knockout stage.)							
Year	Pld	W	L	D	Pts	GF	GA	GD	Pld	W	L	D	GF	GA	GD	Pld	W	L	D	Pts	GF	GA	GD	Pld	W	L	D	Pts	GF	GA	GD
2007	30	6	17	7	25	25	49	–24	–							–								–							
2008	30	9	13	8	35	34	43	–9	–							4	1	1	2	5	4	4	0	–							
2009	30	10	11	9	39	37	46	–9	–							4	3	1	0	9	8	3	+5	2	0	1	1	1	0	1	–1
2010	30	9	13	8	35	33	41	–8	–							4	2	0	2	8	3	0	+3	8	3	2	3	12	8	9	–1
2011	34	6	13	15	33	36	59	–23	–							4	3	0	1	10	7	2	+5	8	5	2	1	16	11	9	+2
2012	34	5	21	8	23	36	62	–26	–							4	2	0	2	8	4	1	+3	8	3	3	2	11	16	15	+1
2013	34	6	17	11	29	30	47	–17	–							2	1	1	0	3	2	6	–4	–							
2014	34	11	15	8	41	44	54	–10	–							4	1	2	1	4	4	5	–1	–							
2015	34	15	15	4	49	58	58	0	1	0	1	0	0	3	–3	2	1	1	0	3	3	3	0	–							
2016	34	14	9	11	53	51	39	+12	6	4	1	1	17	6	+11	4	2	1	1	7	6	4	+2	–							
2017	34	20	5	9	69	74	37	+37	5	3	1	1	5	2	+3	4	2	1	1	7	8	4	+4	–							
2018	34	10	18	6	36	59	64	–5	–							4	3	0	1	10	11	4	+7	9	4	3	2	14	14	12	+2
2019	34	13	10	11	50	57	52	+5	4	3	1	0	10	6	+4	4	3	1	0	9	6	1	+5	2	0	1	1	1	1	5	–4
2020 (Note: The MLS regular season was suspended on March 12 due to the COVID-19 pandemic, resulting in the cancellation of matches. The season resumed in July with the MLS is Back Tournament, where the three group stage matches counted as regular season games. Additionally, the Canadian Championship tournament was reduced to a single game due to the pandemic, which was not played until the 2022 calendar year.)	23	13	5	5	44	33	26	+7	1	0	1	0	0	1	–1	1	0	0	1	1	1	1	0	1	0	1	0	0	1	3	–2
2021	34	6	18	10	28	39	66	–27	–							3	2	1	0	6	6	2	+4	4	1	2	1	4	4	6	–2
2022	34	9	18	7	34	49	66	–17	–							3	2	0	1	7	7	2	+5	–							
2023	34	4	20	10	22	26	59	–33	–							1	0	1	0	0	1	2	–1	2	0	2	0	0	0	6	–6
2024	34	11	19	4	37	40	61	–21	–							6	4	1	1	13	18	3	+15	3	1	1	1	4	5	5	0
2025	34	6	14	14	32	37	44	–7	–							1	0	0	1	1	2	2	0	–							
2026	34	9	13	12	39	52	67	–15	–							1	0	1	0	0	1	3	–2	–							
Totals	653	192	284	177	753	850	1,040	–190	17	10	5	2	32	18	+14	60	32	13	15	111	102	52	+50	47	17	18	12	63	60	71	–11
