= List of Canadian Championship finals =

Canadian Championship final
- Organiser(s): Canadian Soccer Association
- Founded: 2011
- Teams: 2 finalists from 15 team tournament
- Qualifier for: CONCACAF Champions Cup
- Current champions: Forge FC (1st title)
- Most championships: Toronto FC (6 titles) (Note: Toronto FC have won the Canadian Championship 8 times, but only 6 of those titles were won in a final since the tournament became a knockout tournament in 2011.)
- Broadcaster: OneSoccer (since 2019)
- Website: Official website
- 2026 Canadian Championship final

The Canadian Championship final is the championship match or two-legged tie to determine the winner of the Canadian Championship. It was first held in 2011 following Canadian Soccer Association's decision to replace the round-robin format with a knockout tournament to reduce fixture congestion for the participating teams. The final was played as a two-legged series until changing to a single match in 2019.

Toronto FC are the most successful team in the finals, having won six times. Since its inception, a non-Major League Soccer club has only reached the final three times: Forge FC in 2020 (due to a revised competition format for the shortened 2020 season where the Canadian Premier League automatically gained a berth into the final) and 2026, and Vancouver FC in 2025.

Despite playing in five semi-finals, FC Edmonton were never able to reach a final during their eleven seasons of professional soccer before being dissolved.

== History ==
From 2008 to 2010, the Canadian Championship was played as a round-robin tournament between Canada's three professional soccer clubs: the Montreal Impact, Toronto FC, and Vancouver Whitecaps FC. In 2011, the addition of FC Edmonton to Canadian professional soccer meant that a league format would require each participant to play six matches instead of four, something that was unpopular with the participating clubs' players and staff. The round-robin format was also responsible for the controversial end of the 2009 Canadian Championship, which brought about further demand for a change in format, where a team could not suffer due to the results of a match between two other teams. The addition of a fourth team also meant that they could instead run the competition as an even two round tournament with no team requiring byes. It was decided in 2011 that the competition would be reformatted to have a two-legged semifinal round, of which the winners would then face each other in a single match final hosted by the higher seeded team. Before the beginning of the competition, this format was slightly amended once more so that the final would also be played over two legs.

As more Canadian teams were created and gained access into the Canadian Championship in the late 2010s, all rounds including the final would start to be played as a single match starting in 2021, with the host team being determined by draw at the beginning of the competition. In 2024, Canada Soccer brought back the usage of two-legged ties for the quarter-final and semi-final rounds, but the final remained as a single match.

== Finals ==
Key
‡	Match decided by a penalty shoot-out after extra time
§	Match decided by a penalty shoot-out with no extra time
&	Series decided by away goals rule
^	Attendance record

Year	Date(s)	Winner	Score(s)	Runner-up	Venue	City	Attendance
2008	round-robin format, no final held						
2009	round-robin format, no final held						
2010	round-robin format, no final held						
2011	May 18, 2011	Toronto FC	1–1	Vancouver Whitecaps FC	Empire Field	Vancouver, BC	15,474
2011	July 2, 2011 (Note: Match was originally played on May 25, but had to be abandoned in the 60th minute and postponed due to severe weather.)	Toronto FC	2–1	Vancouver Whitecaps FC	BMO Field	Toronto, ON	18,212
2012	May 16, 2012	Toronto FC	1–1	Vancouver Whitecaps FC	BC Place	Vancouver, BC	14,878
2012	May 23, 2012	Toronto FC	1–0	Vancouver Whitecaps FC	BMO Field	Toronto, ON	13,777
2013	May 15, 2013	Montreal Impact	0–0 &	Vancouver Whitecaps FC	Saputo Stadium	Montreal, QC	12,016
2013	May 29, 2013	Montreal Impact	2–2 &	Vancouver Whitecaps FC	BC Place	Vancouver, BC	18,183
2014	May 28, 2014	Montreal Impact	1–1	Toronto FC	BMO Field	Toronto, ON	18,269
2014	June 4, 2014	Montreal Impact	1–0	Toronto FC	Saputo Stadium	Montreal, QC	13,423
2015	August 12, 2015	Vancouver Whitecaps FC	2–2	Montreal Impact	Saputo Stadium	Montreal, QC	12,395
2015	August 26, 2015	Vancouver Whitecaps FC	2–0	Montreal Impact	BC Place	Vancouver, BC	19,616
2016	June 21, 2016	Toronto FC	1–0 &	Vancouver Whitecaps FC	BMO Field	Toronto, ON	20,011
2016	June 29, 2016	Toronto FC	1–2 &	Vancouver Whitecaps FC	BC Place	Vancouver, BC	19,376
2017	June 21, 2017	Toronto FC	1–1	Montreal Impact	Saputo Stadium	Montreal, QC	14,329
2017	June 27, 2017	Toronto FC	2–1	Montreal Impact	BMO Field	Toronto, ON	26,539 ^
2018	August 8, 2018	Toronto FC	2–2	Vancouver Whitecaps FC	BC Place	Vancouver, BC	16,833
2018	August 15, 2018	Toronto FC	5–2	Vancouver Whitecaps FC	BMO Field	Toronto, ON	14,994
2019	September 18, 2019	Montreal Impact	1–0	Toronto FC	Saputo Stadium	Montreal, QC	10,807
2019	September 25, 2019	Montreal Impact	0–1 § (3–1 p)	Toronto FC	BMO Field	Toronto, ON	21,365
2020	June 4, 2022 (Note: The 2020 Canadian Championship final was played in the summer of 2022, due to scheduling difficulties in the 2020 and 2021 seasons associated with the COVID-19 pandemic.)	Toronto FC	1–1 § (5–4 p)	Forge FC	Tim Hortons Field	Hamilton, ON	13,715
2021	November 21, 2021	CF Montréal	1–0	Toronto FC	Saputo Stadium	Montreal, QC	12,000
2022	July 26, 2022	Vancouver Whitecaps FC	1–1 § (5–3 p)	Toronto FC	BC Place	Vancouver, BC	24,307
2023	June 7, 2023	Vancouver Whitecaps FC	2–1	CF Montréal	BC Place	Vancouver, BC	20,072
2024	September 25, 2024	Vancouver Whitecaps FC	0–0 § (4–2 p)	Toronto FC	BC Place	Vancouver, BC	12,516
2025	October 1, 2025	Vancouver Whitecaps FC	4–2	Vancouver FC	BC Place	Vancouver, BC	18,372
2026	October 21, 2026	Forge FC	1–1 ‡ (4–2 p)	CF Montréal	Saputo Stadium	Montreal, QC	14,081

== Statistics ==
=== Team records ===
==== Appearances ====
As of 2026 final

Club	Apps	W	L	W%	Years won	Years lost
Toronto FC	11	6	5	54.5	2011, 2012, 2016, 2017, 2018, 2020	2014, 2019, 2021, 2022, 2024
Vancouver Whitecaps FC	10	5	5	50.0	2015, 2022, 2023, 2024, 2025	2011, 2012, 2013, 2016, 2018
CF Montréal	8	4	4	50.0	2013, 2014, 2019, 2021	2015, 2017, 2023, 2026
Forge FC	2	1	1	50.0	2026	2020
Vancouver FC	1	0	1	0.0	—N/a	2025

==== Streaks ====
- Most consecutive final wins: **4** – Vancouver Whitecaps FC (2022–2025)
- Most consecutive final appearances: **7** – Toronto FC (2016–2022)

=== Player records ===
As of 2025 final

Top goalscorers in finals
Rank	Player	Club(s)	Goals
1	(United States) Jozy Altidore	Toronto FC	4
1	(Italy) Sebastian Giovinco	Toronto FC	4
3	(Canada) Ali Ahmed	Vancouver Whitecaps FC	2
3	(Scotland) **Ryan Gauld**	Vancouver Whitecaps FC	2
3	(France) Eric Hassli	Vancouver Whitecaps FC	2
3	(Sierra Leone) Kei Kamara	Vancouver Whitecaps FC	2
3	(Brazil) Felipe Martins	Montreal Impact	2
3	(United States) Tim Parker	Vancouver Whitecaps FC	2
3	(Brazil) Camilo Sanvezzo	Vancouver Whitecaps FC	2
3	(United States) **Brian White**	Vancouver Whitecaps FC	2

Bold indicates that player is still active for a Canadian club.

== See also ==
- Canadian Premier League Finals
- List of U.S. Open Cup finals
