= 2023 Canadian Championship final =

Final game of a Canadian soccer tournament

Canadian Championship final
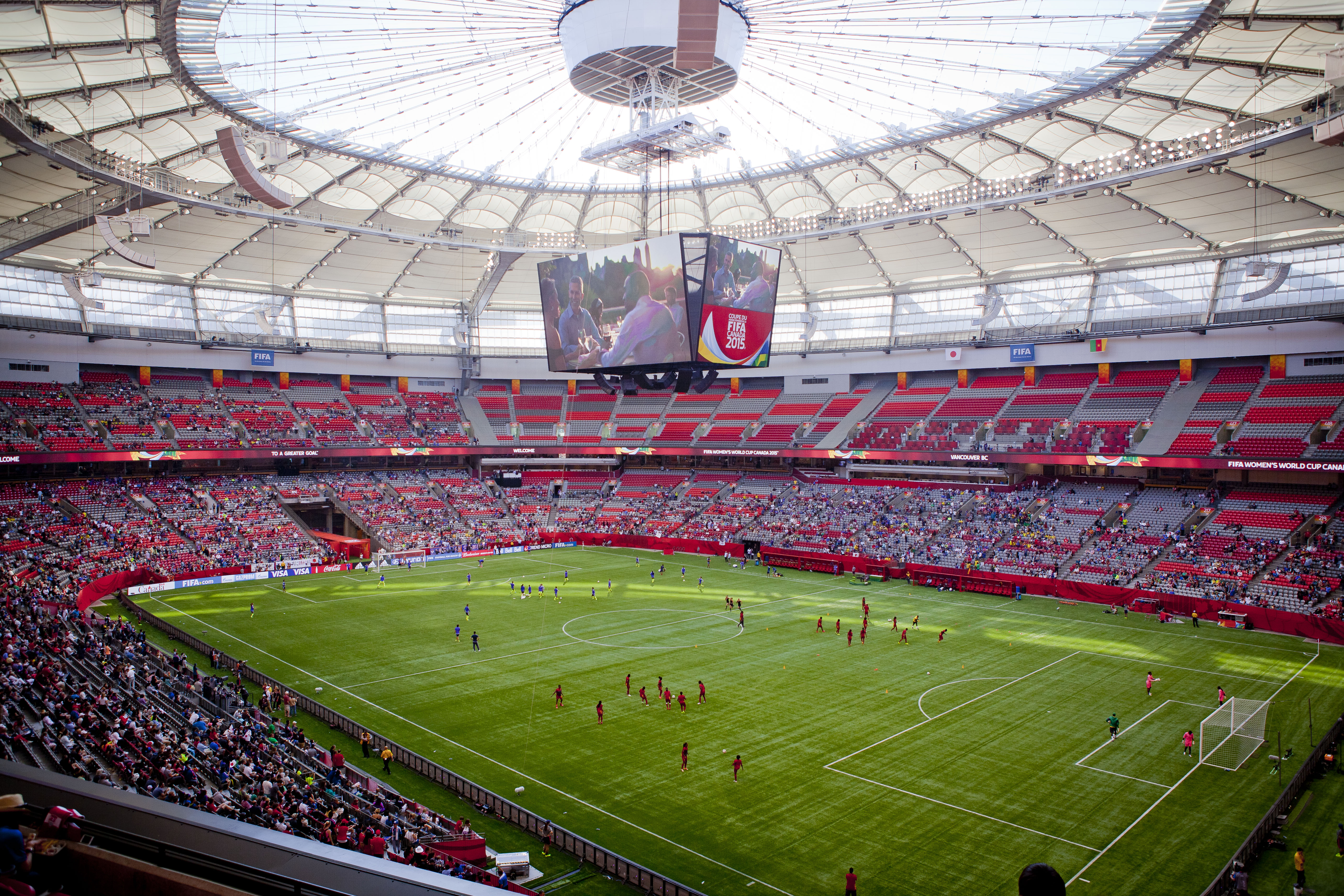
- BC Place in Vancouver, British Columbia hosted the match.
- Event: 2023 Canadian Championship
Vancouver Whitecaps FC	CF Montréal
2	1
- Date: June 7, 2023
- Venue: BC Place, Vancouver, British Columbia
- Player of the Match: Ryan Gauld (Vancouver Whitecaps FC)
- Referee: Filip Dujic
- Attendance: 20,072
- Weather: Mostly Cloudy; 26 °C (79 °F); 34% humidity

The 2023 Canadian Championship final was the deciding match of the 2023 Canadian Championship and was played on June 7, 2023. For the second year in a row, it was hosted at BC Place in Vancouver, British Columbia by defending champions Vancouver Whitecaps FC, who played CF Montréal.

This was the third final played between Vancouver and Montreal, with the clubs having met in the 2013 and 2015 finals. This was also the first final since 2015 to not involve Toronto FC.

Vancouver Whitecaps won their third title following a 2–1 victory, qualifying them for the 2024 CONCACAF Champions Cup.

== Teams ==
Team	League	City	Previous finals appearances (bold indicates winners)
Vancouver Whitecaps FC	Major League Soccer (West)	Vancouver, British Columbia	7 (2011, 2012, 2013, **2015**, 2016, 2018, **2022**)
CF Montréal	Major League Soccer (East)	Montreal, Quebec	6 (**2013**, **2014**, 2015, 2017, **2019**, **2021**)

== Background ==
This was the third time Vancouver Whitecaps FC and CF Montréal faced each other in the Canadian Championship final, with CF Montréal (then Montréal Impact) winning in 2013 and Vancouver Whitecaps FC winning in 2015.

In their most recent fixture earlier in 2023, Vancouver Whitecaps FC defeated CF Montréal 5–0 in the MLS regular season.

=== Path to the final ===
Each tie of the four-round tournament was played as a single-leg fixture. Vancouver Whitecaps FC received a bye in the preliminary round for being a finalist of the 2022 tournament.

Vancouver Whitecaps FC		Round	CF Montréal	
Opponent	Result	Round	Opponent	Result
Bye		Preliminary round	Vaughan Azzurri	2–0 (H)
York United FC	4–1 (A)	Quarter-finals	Toronto FC	2–1 (A)
Pacific FC	3–0 (A)	Semi-finals	Forge FC	2–0 (H)

== Match details ==
June 7, 2023
7:00 pm PDT

Vancouver Whitecaps FC	2–1	CF Montréal
White 57'; Gauld 65' (pen.)	Report	Ibrahim 83'

BC Place, Vancouver, British Columbia
Attendance: 20,072
Referee: Filip Dujic

**Vancouver Whitecaps FC**	**CF Montréal**

GK	18	(Japan) Yohei Takaoka
RB	23	(Jamaica) Javain Brown
CB	6	(United States) Tristan Blackmon
CB	4	(Serbia) Ranko Veselinović
LB	27	(Canada) Ryan Raposo		(substituted off) 59'
RCM	19	(United States) Julian Gressel		(substituted off) 90'
CM	31	(Canada) Russell Teibert (c)		(substituted off) 59'
LCM	20	(Paraguay) Andrés Cubas
RM	28	(Canada) Levonte Johnson		(substituted off) 73'
LM	25	(Scotland) Ryan Gauld
CF	24	(United States) Brian White		(substituted off) 90'
Substitutes:
GK	1	(Canada) Thomas Hasal
DF	14	(Portugal) Luís Martins		(substituted on) 59'
MF	16	(United States) Sebastian Berhalter	(yellow card) 85'	(substituted on) 73'
MF	29	(United States) Simon Becher
MF	45	(Ecuador) Pedro Vite		(substituted on) 59'
FW	7	(Colombia) Déiber Caicedo		(substituted on) 90'
FW	9	(Venezuela) Sergio Córdova		(substituted on) 90'
Manager: (Italy) Vanni Sartini

GK	40	(Canada) Jonathan Sirois
CB	25	(Italy) Gabriele Corbo		(substituted off) 78'
CB	4	(France) Rudy Camacho	(yellow card) 59'
CB	18	(Canada) Joel Waterman
RM	22	(United States) Aaron Herrera		(substituted off) 67'
CM	25	(Canada) Mathieu Choinière
CM	2	(Kenya) Victor Wanyama		(substituted off) 67'
LM	11	(Costa Rica) Ariel Lassiter	(yellow card) 3'
RF	14	(Nigeria) Sunusi Ibrahim
CF	7	(Egypt) Ahmed Hamdi		(substituted off) 67'
LF	9	(Nigeria) Chinonso Offor		(substituted off) 78'
Substitutes:
GK	41	(Canada) James Pantemis
DF	15	(Canada) Zachary Brault-Guillard		(substituted on) 67'
DF	24	(United States) George Campbell
MF	10	(United States) Bryce Duke		(substituted on) 84'
MF	19	(Canada) Nathan Saliba		(substituted on) 67'
FW	13	(United States) Mason Toye		(substituted on) 78'
FW	21	(Finland) Lassi Lappalainen		(substituted on) 67'
Manager: (Argentina) Hernán Losada

Player of the Match:
Ryan Gauld (Vancouver Whitecaps FC)

Assistant referees:
Micheal Barwegen
Lyes Arfa
Fourth official:
Yusri Rudolf
Fifth official:
Michael Hood

**Match rules**

- 90 minutes
- Penalty shoot-out if score still level
- Minimum of three Canadian starters
- Maximum of five substitutions (Note: Each team was given only three opportunities to make substitutions excluding substitutions made at half-time.) plus two "concussion substitutions" if required

== Post-match ==
Following the match, Vancouver Whitecaps FC's Ali Ahmed was presented with the Best Young Canadian Player Award and Julian Gressel with the George Gross Memorial Trophy as the most valuable player of the Canadian Championship. Ahmed missed the final as he continued to recover from a concussion suffered in the tournament's semifinal.

By scoring in the final, CF Montréal's Sunusi Ibrahim became the top goal scorer of the tournament with three goals.
