= 2018 Canadian Championship final =

Final of 2018 Canadian soccer competition

- Event: 2018 Canadian Championship
Vancouver Whitecaps FC	Toronto FC
4	7
- on aggregate

First leg
Vancouver Whitecaps FC	Toronto FC
2	2
- Date: August 8, 2018
- Venue: BC Place, Vancouver, British Columbia
- Referee: David Gantar
- Attendance: 16,833

Second leg
Toronto FC	Vancouver Whitecaps FC
5	2
- Date: August 15, 2018
- Venue: BMO Field, Toronto, Ontario
- Referee: Drew Fischer
- Attendance: 14,994

The 2018 Canadian Championship final was the deciding series of the 2018 Canadian Championship. The series was contested by rivals Toronto FC and the Vancouver Whitecaps FC of Major League Soccer. It was the fourth final series to be played between Vancouver and Toronto, with Toronto having won all previous encounters. Toronto FC successfully defended their 2017 title with a 7–4 aggregate victory over Vancouver, obtaining their seventh national championship title and qualifying for the 2019 CONCACAF Champions League.

== Teams ==
Team	League	City	Previous finals appearances (bold indicates winners)
Vancouver Whitecaps FC	MLS (West)	Vancouver, British Columbia	5 (2011, 2012, 2013, **2015**, 2016)
Toronto FC	MLS (East)	Toronto, Ontario	5 (**2011**, **2012**, 2014, **2016**, **2017**)

== Path to the final ==
=== Vancouver Whitecaps FC ===
The Whitecaps had a bye into the semi-finals where they met fellow MLS side Montreal Impact. After losing their first match in Montreal by one goal, Vancouver would make a comeback in the second leg with an early goal from Yordy Reyna and winning penalty kick from Kei Kamara.

=== Toronto FC ===
As the defending champions, Toronto FC gained a bye to the semi-finals where they would have to play the winner of the second qualifying round. In the semi-finals, they cruised past the Ottawa Fury FC winning both legs of the series. However, Toronto FC had to terminate the status of their Inebriatti supporters' group for setting fire to TD Place Stadium during the away match.

=== Results summary ===
Vancouver Whitecaps FC				Round	Toronto FC			
Opponent	Agg.	1st leg	2nd leg	Round	Opponent	Agg.	1st leg	2nd leg
Bye				First qualifying round	Bye			
Bye				Second qualifying round	Bye			
Montreal Impact	2–1	0–1 (A)	2–0 (H)	Semi-finals	Ottawa Fury FC	4–0	1–0 (A)	3–0 (H)

== Match details ==
=== First leg ===
August 8, 2018
7:00 pm PDT

Vancouver Whitecaps FC	2–2	Toronto FC
Kamara 24' (pen.); Hurtado 84'	Report	Osorio 26'; Henry 90+6' (o.g.)

BC Place, Vancouver, British Columbia
Attendance: 16,833
Referee: David Gantar

**Vancouver Whitecaps FC**	**Toronto FC**

GK	1	(Australia) Stefan Marinovic
RB	28	(United States) Jake Nerwinski
CB	4	(Costa Rica) Kendall Waston (c)
CB	2	(Canada) Doneil Henry
LB	17	(Canada) Marcel de Jong
RM	13	(Uruguay) Cristian Techera	(substituted off) 46'
CM	31	(Canada) Russell Teibert
CM	8	(Brazil) Felipe Martins	(red card) 45+1'
LM	67	(Canada) Alphonso Davies	(substituted off) 87'
FW	29	(Peru) Yordy Reyna
FW	23	(Sierra Leone) Kei Kamara	(substituted off) 67'
Substitutes:
MF	20	(United States) Brek Shea	(substituted on) 87'
MF	66	(Egypt) Ali Ghazal	(substituted on) 46'
FW	19	(United States) Erik Hurtado	(substituted on) 67'
FW	11	(Uruguay) Nicolás Mezquida
DF	3	(United States) Sean Franklin
FW	9	(Venezuela) Anthony Blondell
GK	12	(United States) Brian Rowe
Manager: (Wales) Carl Robinson

GK	1	(United States) Clint Irwin
RB	13	(United States) Eriq Zavaleta
CB	6	(United States) Nick Hagglund
LB	23	(Democratic Republic of the Congo) Chris Mavinga		(substituted off) 46'
RM	96	(Brazil) Auro Jr.		(substituted off) 64'
LCM	18	(United States) Mark Delgado
CM	4	(United States) Michael Bradley (c)
RCM	21	(Canada) Jonathan Osorio
LM	5	(Canada) Ashtone Morgan		(substituted off) 71'
FW	87	(Canada) Tosaint Ricketts
FW	17	(United States) Jozy Altidore
Substitutes:
DF	2	(United States) Justin Morrow	(yellow card) 78'	(substituted on) 46'
MF	54	(Trinidad and Tobago) Ryan Telfer		(substituted on) 64'
DF	12	(Cuba) Jason Hernandez		(substituted on) 71'
FW	22	(Canada) Jordan Hamilton
GK	25	(United States) Alex Bono
MF	27	(Canada) Liam Fraser
FW	11	(Spain) Jon Bakero
Manager: (United States) Greg Vanney

=== Second leg ===
August 15, 2018
7:30 pm EDT

Toronto FC	5–2	Vancouver Whitecaps FC
Altidore 39', 49', 53'; Giovinco 44'; Ricketts 80'	Report	Kamara 63'; Shea 77'

BMO Field, Toronto, Ontario
Attendance: 14,994
Referee: Drew Fischer

**Toronto FC**	**Vancouver Whitecaps FC**

GK	1	(United States) Clint Irwin
RB	2	(United States) Justin Morrow
CB	13	(United States) Eriq Zavaleta
CB	23	(Democratic Republic of the Congo) Chris Mavinga	(substituted off) 63'
LB	5	(Canada) Ashtone Morgan
RM	14	(Canada) Jay Chapman
CM	4	(United States) Michael Bradley (c)
LM	21	(Canada) Jonathan Osorio	(substituted off) 78'
AM	18	(United States) Mark Delgado
FW	10	(Italy) Sebastian Giovinco	(substituted off) 67'
FW	17	(United States) Jozy Altidore
Substitutes:
DF	6	(United States) Nick Hagglund	(substituted on) 63'
MF	54	(Trinidad and Tobago) Ryan Telfer	(substituted on) 67'
FW	87	(Canada) Tosaint Ricketts	(substituted on) 78'
GK	25	(United States) Alex Bono
MF	46	(Japan) Tsubasa Endoh
DF	9	(Netherlands) Gregory van der Wiel
Manager: (United States) Greg Vanney

GK	1	(Australia) Stefan Marinovic
RB	28	(United States) Jake Nerwinski
CB	4	(Costa Rica) Kendall Waston (c)
CB	2	(Canada) Doneil Henry
LB	17	(Canada) Marcel de Jong
RM	13	(Uruguay) Cristian Techera	(substituted off) 51'
CM	66	(Egypt) Ali Ghazal
CM	31	(Canada) Russell Teibert
LM	67	(Canada) Alphonso Davies	(substituted off) 51'
FW	29	(Peru) Yordy Reyna
FW	23	(Sierra Leone) Kei Kamara	(substituted off) 63'
Substitutes:
MF	20	(United States) Brek Shea	(substituted on) 51'
FW	11	(Uruguay) Nicolás Mezquida	(substituted on) 51'
FW	19	(United States) Erik Hurtado	(substituted on) 63'
GK	12	(United States) Brian Rowe
MF	6	(Mexico) Efrain Juarez
DF	3	(United States) Sean Franklin
FW	9	(Venezuela) Anthony Blondell
Manager: (Wales) Carl Robinson
