= 2024 Canadian Championship final =

Final match of a Canadian soccer tournament

Canadian Championship final
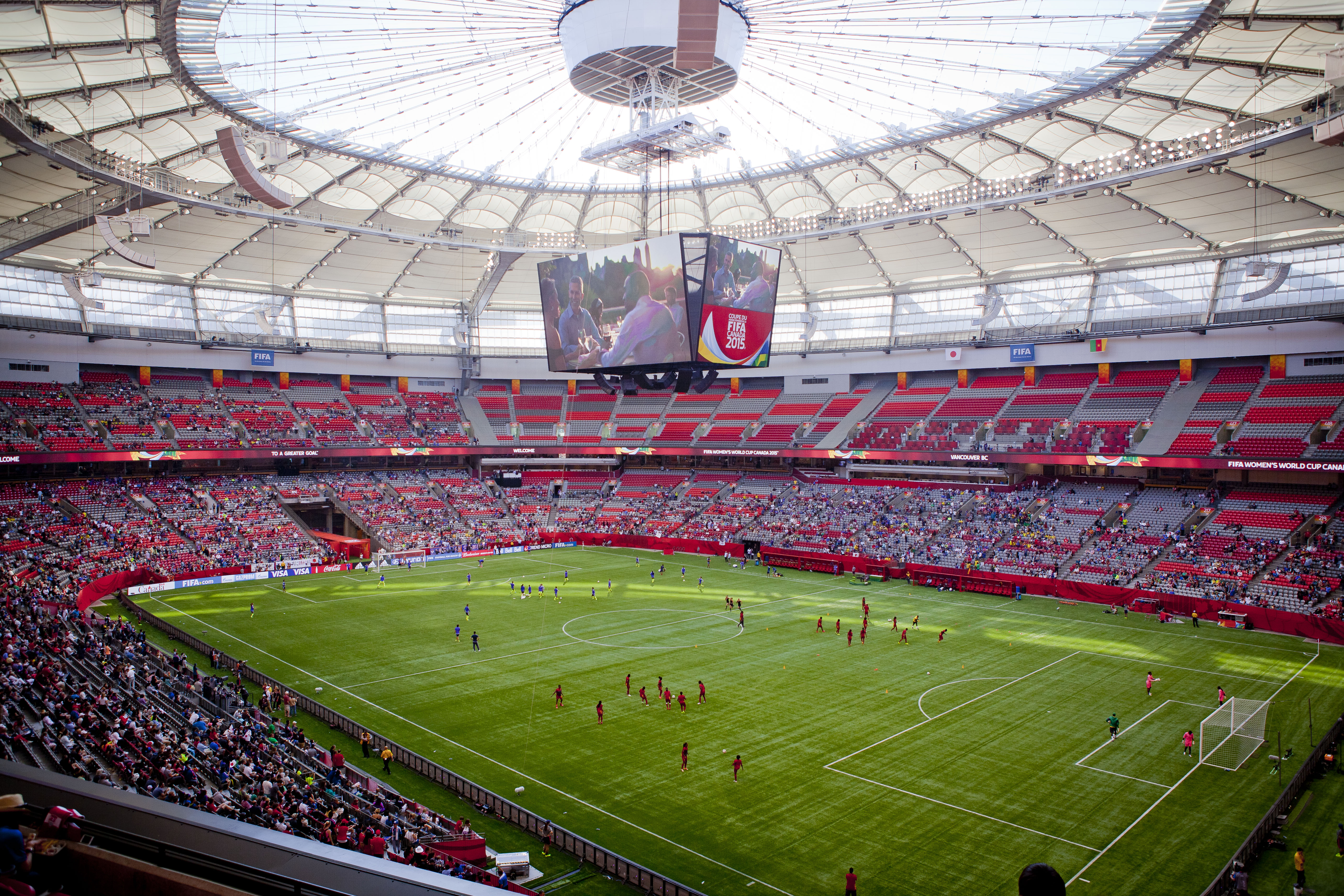
- BC Place in Vancouver, British Columbia hosted the match.
- Event: 2024 Canadian Championship
Vancouver Whitecaps FC	Toronto FC
0	0
- Vancouver Whitecaps FC won 4–2 on penalties
- Date: September 25, 2024
- Venue: BC Place, Vancouver, British Columbia
- Player of the Match: Isaac Boehmer (Vancouver Whitecaps FC)
- Referee: Marie-Soleil Beaudoin
- Attendance: 12,516

The 2024 Canadian Championship final was the deciding match of the 2024 Canadian Championship and was played on September 25, 2024. For the third year in a row, it was hosted at BC Place in Vancouver, British Columbia, by two-time defending champions Vancouver Whitecaps FC, who faced Toronto FC. It was the sixth final played between the two clubs.

The match was tied 0–0 and decided in a penalty shoot-out, which the Whitecaps won 4–2 for a third consecutive title. Vancouver qualified for the 2025 CONCACAF Champions Cup as the winner of the final.

== Teams ==
Team	League	City	Previous finals appearances (bold indicates winners)
Vancouver Whitecaps FC	Major League Soccer	Vancouver, British Columbia	8 (2011, 2012, 2013, **2015**, 2016, 2018, **2022**, **2023**)
Toronto FC	Major League Soccer	Toronto, Ontario	10 (**2011**, **2012**, 2014, **2016**, **2017**, **2018**, 2019, **2020**, 2021, 2022)

== Background ==
=== Path to the final ===
Vancouver Whitecaps FC		Round	Toronto FC	
Opponent	Result	Round	Opponent	Result
Bye		Preliminary round	Simcoe County Rovers FC	5–0 (Home)
Cavalry FC	2–2 agg. (a)	Quarter-finals	CS Saint-Laurent	11–1 agg.
Pacific FC	2–0 agg.	Semi-finals	Forge FC	2–2 agg. (a)

== Match details ==
September 25, 2024
7:00 pm PDT

Vancouver Whitecaps FC	0–0	Toronto FC
	Report
Penalties
Gauld (penalty scored); Armstrong (penalty missed); Berhalter (penalty scored); White (penalty scored); Utvik (penalty scored)	4–2	(penalty scored) Owusu; (penalty missed) Longstaff; (penalty missed) Thompson; (penalty scored) Osorio

BC Place, Vancouver, British Columbia
Attendance: 12,516
Referee: Marie-Soleil Beaudoin

**Vancouver Whitecaps FC**	**Toronto FC**

GK	32	(Canada) Isaac Boehmer
CB	2	(Paraguay) Mathías Laborda	(yellow card) 53'
CB	4	(Serbia) Ranko Veselinović
CB	15	(Norway) Bjørn Inge Utvik
RM	22	(Canada) Ali Ahmed		(substituted off) 46'
CM	20	(Paraguay) Andrés Cubas
CM	45	(Ecuador) Pedro Vite		(substituted off) 85'
LM	3	(Canada) Sam Adekugbe		(substituted off) 72'
RF	24	(United States) Brian White	(yellow card) 90+3'
AM	25	(Scotland) Ryan Gauld (c)
LF	11	(Haiti) Fafà Picault	(yellow card) 15'	(substituted off) 60'
Substitutes:
GK	1	(Japan) Yohei Takaoka
DF	6	(United States) Tristan Blackmon
MF	7	(Canada) Ryan Raposo		(substituted on) 46'
MF	8	(Austria) Alessandro Schöpf		(substituted on) 60'
MF	16	(United States) Sebastian Berhalter		(substituted on) 72'
MF	26	(Scotland) Stuart Armstrong		(substituted on) 85'
FW	28	(Canada) Levonte Johnson
Manager: (Italy) Vanni Sartini

GK	1	(United States) Sean Johnson
CB	27	(United States) Shane O'Neill		(substituted off) 72'
CB	5	(Republic of Ireland) Kevin Long
CB	28	(Italy) Raoul Petretta
RM	10	(Italy) Federico Bernardeschi
CM	14	(Spain) Alonso Coello		(substituted off) 84'
CM	8	(England) Matty Longstaff
LM	22	(Canada) Richie Laryea
AM	21	(Canada) Jonathan Osorio (c)
CF	9	(Canada) Deandre Kerr	(yellow card) 45+1'	(substituted off) 68'
AM	24	(Italy) Lorenzo Insigne		(substituted off) 68'
Substitutes:
GK	90	(Canada) Luka Gavran
DF	6	(Zambia) Aimé Mabika
DF	17	(Norway) Sigurd Rosted		(substituted on) 72'
DF	19	(Canada) Kobe Franklin
MF	20	(Honduras) Deiby Flores		(substituted on) 84'
MF	47	(Canada) Kosi Thompson		(substituted on) 68'
FW	99	(Germany) Prince Owusu		(substituted on) 68'
Manager: (England) John Herdman

Player of the Match:
Isaac Boehmer (Vancouver Whitecaps FC)

Assistant referees:
Chris Wattam
Gérard-Kader Lebuis
Fourth official:
Filip Dujic
Fifth official:
Stefan Tanaka-Freundt
