= 2026 Canadian Championship final =

Final match of a Canadian soccer tournament

Canadian Championship final
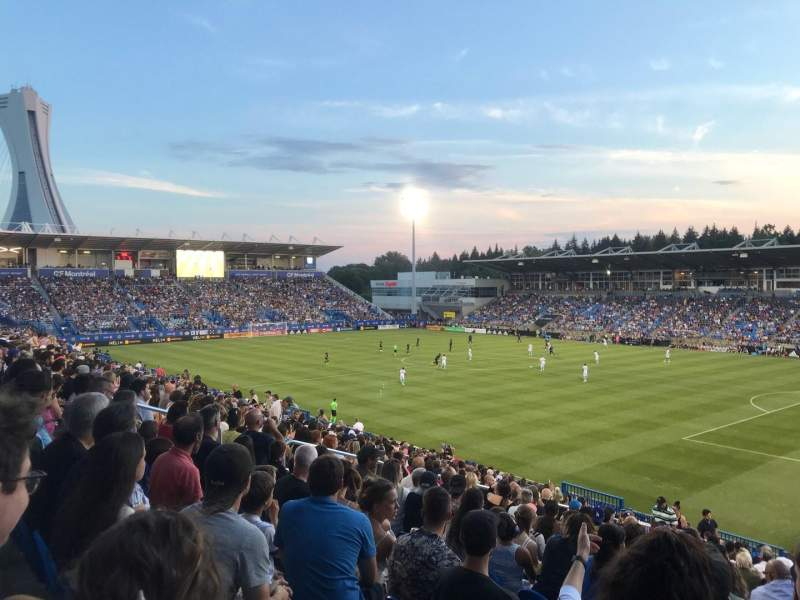
- Saputo Stadium in Montreal hosted the match.
- Event: 2026 Canadian Championship
CF Montréal	Forge FC
1	1
- After extra time Forge won 4–2 on penalties
- Date: October 21, 2026
- Venue: Saputo Stadium, Montreal, Quebec
- Player of the Match: Dimitry Bertaud (Forge FC)
- Referee: Michael Venne
- Attendance: 14,081
- Weather: Fair; 7 °C (45 °F); 66% humidity

The 2026 Canadian Championship final was the deciding match of the 2026 Canadian Championship, played on October 21, 2026. The match was hosted at Saputo Stadium in Montreal. The winners, Forge FC, qualified for the 2027 CONCACAF Champions Cup after winning in a penalty shoot-out. This was the first Canadian Championship final to be won by a Canadian Premier League club.

== Teams ==
Team	League	City	Previous finals appearances (bold indicates winners)
CF Montréal	Major League Soccer	Montreal, Quebec	7 (**2013**, **2014**, 2015, 2017, **2019**, **2021**, 2023)
Forge FC	Canadian Premier League	Hamilton, Ontario	1 (2020)

== Background ==
CF Montréal had won five previous tournament titles, with their most recent being in 2021. Forge FC entered the match seeking their first Voyageurs Cup, after losing in a penalty shoot-out in their only previous final appearance in the pandemic-delayed 2020 edition, played in 2022.

The clubs had met in each of the past five editions of the tournament. Forge eliminated Montreal in the quarter-finals of the most recent 2024 and 2025 tournaments, while Montreal eliminated Forge in the three editions prior: twice in the semi-finals (2021 and 2023) and once in the quarter-finals (2022).

As determined by the draw, the winner of the mostly-western half of the bracket, CF Montréal, hosted the final; CF Montréal were the only eastern team on that side of the bracket. The match was broadcast nationally in Canada on TSN, RDS, and OneSoccer. The game was broadcast in the United States on FS2.

=== Path to the final ===
CF Montréal		Round	Forge FC	
Opponent	Result	Round	Opponent	Result
Calgary Blizzard SC	5–0 (home)	Preliminary round	HFX Wanderers FC	4–0 (home)
Vancouver FC	4–2 agg.	Quarter-finals	CS Saint-Laurent	4–3 agg.
Vancouver Whitecaps FC	3–2 agg.	Semi-finals	FC Supra du Québec	2–1 agg.

== Match details ==
=== Recap ===
CF Montréal dominated in possession at the start of the match and recorded three shots on target in the opening 10 minutes. In the 21st minute, Montreal was awarded a penalty when striker Prince Owusu was taken down in the penalty area by Manjrekar James. After an FVS challenge was upheld, Owusu took the penalty but was stopped by Forge keeper Dimitry Bertaud who dove to his left to make the save. In the sixth minute of first half added time, Forge opened the scoring when Noah Jensen sent a corner kick to the near post which was headed in by Antoine Batisse.

Montréal responded quickly after halftime when Daniel Ríos beat Bertaud with a header from open play in the 49th minute. Just five minutes later, Montréal were reduced to 10 men when Brayan Vera was sent off after receiving a second yellow card for diving. Forge controlled play for the rest of the half but were unable to take advantage leaving the score level after 90 minutes. Both teams had chances to take the lead in extra time but no goals were scored leaving the match to be decided by a penalty shoot-out.

Tristan Borges took the first attempt in the shoot-out and beat Sebastian Breza to give Forge the early lead. Prince Owusu shot next but was once again denied by Bertaud. Through the next three rounds, Breza and Bertaud each made one save giving Forge a 3–2 advantage going into the fifth round. Manjrekar James scored the decisive penalty, securing the Voyageurs Cup for Forge FC.

=== Details ===
October 21, 2026
7:00 pm EDT

CF Montréal	1–1 (a.e.t.)	Forge FC
Ríos 49'	Report	Batisse 45+6'
Penalties
Owusu (penalty missed); Longstaff (penalty scored); Synchuk (penalty missed); Pereira (penalty scored)	2–4	(penalty scored) Borges; (penalty scored) Paton; (penalty missed) Krutzen; (penalty scored) Nimick; (penalty scored) James

Saputo Stadium, Montreal, Quebec
Attendance: 14,081
Referee: Michael Venne

**CF Montréal**	**Forge FC**

GK	1	(Canada) Sebastian Breza
RB	2	(United States) Jalen Neal
CB	5	(United States) Brandan Craig	(yellow card) 19'	(substituted off) 111'
CB	4	(Colombia) Brayan Vera	(yellow card) 32' (yellow-red card) 54'
LB	13	(Canada) Luca Petrasso
DM	8	(England) Matty Longstaff
DM	21	(Germany) Fabian Herbers		(substituted off) 57'
RW	16	(Venezuela) Wikelman Carmona		(substituted off) 81'
AM	14	(Mexico) Daniel Ríos		(substituted off) 81'
LW	22	(Canada) Victor Loturi
ST	9	(Ghana) Prince Owusu (c)
Substitutes:
GK	33	(Canada) Emil Gazdov
GK	41	(Canada) Samsy Keita
MF	6	(Canada) Samuel Piette
MF	7	(Venezuela) Daniel Pereira		(substituted on) 111'
FW	10	(Chile) Alexis Sánchez
MF	18	(Ukraine) Hennadiy Synchuk	(yellow card) 100'	(substituted on) 81'
FW	23	(Switzerland) Noah Streit		(substituted on) 81'
DF	24	(Bolivia) Efraín Morales		(substituted on) 57'
DF	36	(Canada) Josh Nteziryayo
Manager: (France) Philippe Eullaffroy

GK	16	(Democratic Republic of the Congo) Dimitry Bertaud
LB	3	(Serbia) Marko Jevremović	(yellow card) 82'	(substituted off) 105'
CB	5	(Canada) Daniel Nimick
CB	55	(Canada) Manjrekar James	(yellow card) 24'
RB	24	(Albania) Rezart Rama
CM	23	(Canada) Anthony Aromatario		(substituted off) 70'
CM	8	(France) Antoine Batisse
CM	22	(Canada) Noah Jensen (c)		(substituted off) 70'
LW	26	(Canada) Aghilas Sadek		(substituted off) 46'
ST	90	(Canada) Lucas Cavallini	(yellow card) 27'	(substituted off) 42'
RW	87	(Canada) Maxime Bourgeois		(substituted off) 87'
Substitutes:
GK	33	(Canada) Cuba Grant
GK	36	(Canada) Dino Bontis
DF	4	(Netherlands) Daniel Krutzen		(substituted on) 105'
MF	6	(Canada) Ben Paton		(substituted on) 46'
FW	7	(Spain) Ismael Oketokoun		(substituted on) 42'
FW	9	(Canada) Brian Wright
FW	14	(Canada) Levonte Johnson		(substituted on) 70'
FW	17	(Canada) Hoce Massunda		(substituted on) 87'
FW	19	(Canada) Tristan Borges		(substituted on) 70'
Manager: (Canada) Bobby Smyrniotis

Player of the Match:
Dimitry Bertaud (Forge FC)

Assistant referees:
Chris Wattam
Lyes Arfa
Fourth official:
Filip Dujic
Fifth official:
Marie-Han Gagnon-Chrétien
