= 2022 Canadian Championship final =

Final of 2022 Canadian soccer competition

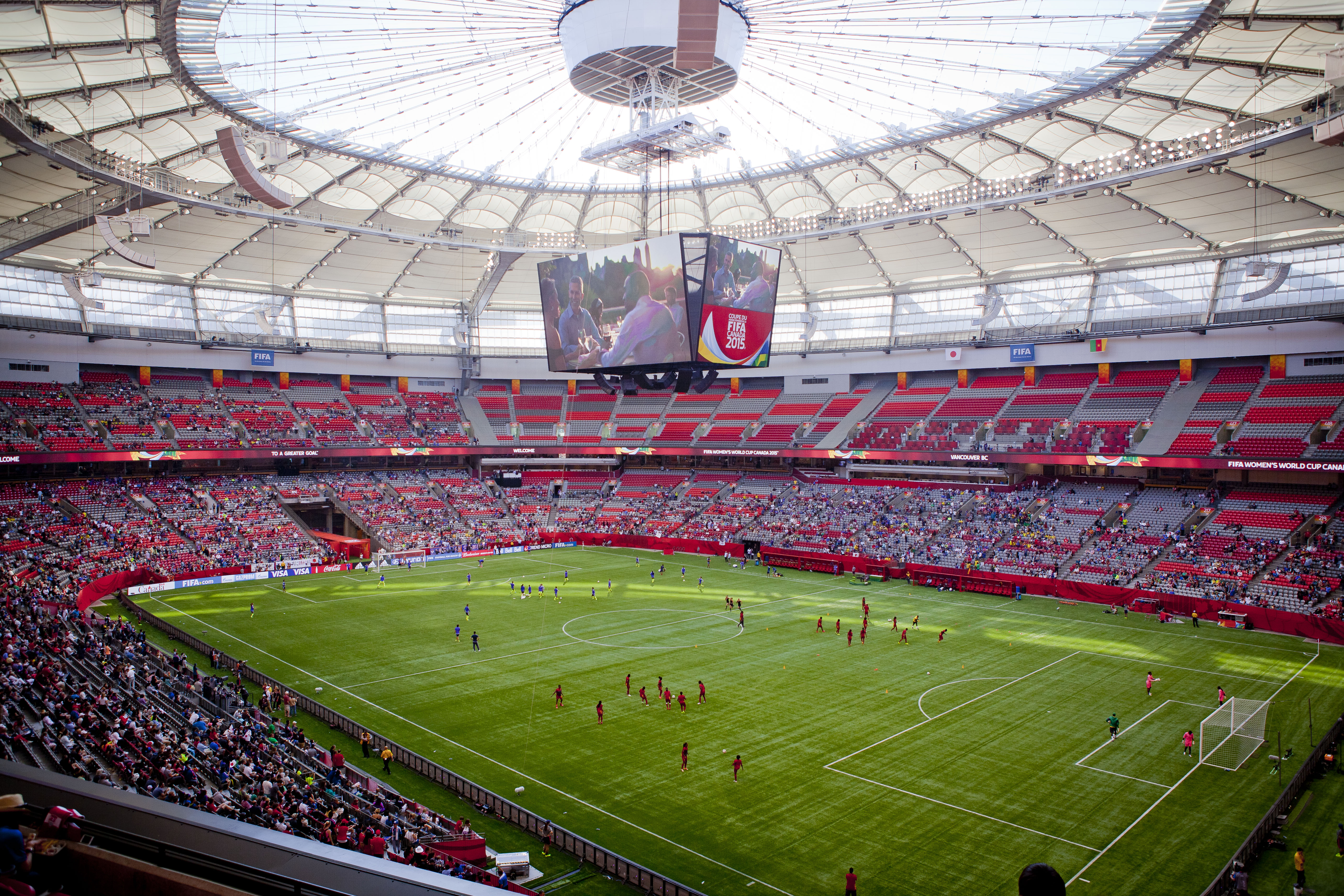
- BC Place in Vancouver, British Columbia hosted the match.
- Event: 2022 Canadian Championship
Vancouver Whitecaps FC	Toronto FC
1	1
- Vancouver Whitecaps FC won 5–3 on penalties
- Date: July 26, 2022
- Venue: BC Place, Vancouver, British Columbia
- Referee: Pierre-Luc Lauzière
- Attendance: 24,307
- Weather: Fair; 26 °C (79 °F); 61% humidity

The 2022 Canadian Championship final was a soccer match played between Vancouver Whitecaps FC and Toronto FC at BC Place on July 26, 2022. The match determined the winner of the 2022 Canadian Championship, Canada's primary men's domestic cup competition.

Vancouver Whitecaps won their second title in a 5–3 penalty shoot-out victory following a 1–1 draw, qualifying them for the 2023 CONCACAF Champions League.

== Teams ==
Team	League	City	Previous finals appearances (bold indicates winners)
Vancouver Whitecaps FC	Major League Soccer	Vancouver, British Columbia	6 (2011, 2012, 2013, **2015**, 2016, 2018)
Toronto FC	Major League Soccer	Toronto, Ontario	9 (**2011**, **2012**, 2014, **2016**, **2017**, **2018**, 2019, **2020**, 2021)

== Background ==
This was the fifth time Vancouver Whitecaps FC and Toronto FC faced each other in the Canadian Championship final with Toronto FC having won all previous ties. The most recent finals meeting took place in 2018 when Toronto FC won 7–4 on aggregate.

=== Path to the final ===
Each tie of the four-round tournament was played as a single-leg fixture. Toronto FC received a bye in the preliminary round for being a finalist of the 2021 tournament.

Vancouver Whitecaps FC		Round	Toronto FC	
Opponent	Result	Round	Opponent	Result
Valour FC (H)	2–0	Preliminary round	Bye	
Cavalry FC (A)	1–1 (5–3 p)	Quarter-finals	HFX Wanderers FC (A)	2–1
York United FC (H)	2–1	Semi-finals	CF Montréal (H)	4–0

== Match details ==
July 26, 2022
7:30 pm PDT
(10:30 pm UTC−4)

Vancouver Whitecaps FC	1–1	Toronto FC
White 19'	Report	MacNaughton 75'
Penalties
Gauld (penalty scored); White (penalty scored); Gressel (penalty scored); Cubas (penalty scored); Blackmon (penalty scored)	5–3	(penalty scored) Criscito; (penalty scored) Perruzza; (penalty missed) Osorio; (penalty scored) Bernardeschi

BC Place, Vancouver, British Columbia
Attendance: 24,307
Referee: Pierre-Luc Lauzière

**Vancouver Whitecaps FC**	**Toronto FC**

GK	55	(United States) Cody Cropper
CB	28	(United States) Jake Nerwinski
CB	4	(Serbia) Ranko Veselinović
CB	6	(United States) Tristan Blackmon
RM	11	(Colombia) Cristian Dájome	(substituted off) 62'
CM	31	(Canada) Russell Teibert (c)	(substituted off) 73'
CM	20	(Paraguay) Andrés Cubas
LM	27	(Canada) Ryan Raposo	(substituted off) 82'
RW	9	(Canada) Lucas Cavallini	(substituted off) 73'
CF	25	(Scotland) Ryan Gauld
LW	24	(United States) Brian White
Substitutes:
GK	60	(Canada) Isaac Boehmer
DF	2	(Canada) Marcus Godinho
DF	19	(Germany) Julian Gressel	(substituted on) 62'
DF	23	(Jamaica) Javain Brown	(substituted on) 82'
MF	33	(Canada) Michael Baldisimo	(substituted on) 73'
MF	45	(Ecuador) Pedro Vite
FW	87	(Canada) Tosaint Ricketts	(substituted on) 73'
Manager: (Italy) Vanni Sartini

GK	25	(United States) Alex Bono
RB	47	(Canada) Kosi Thompson
CB	27	(United States) Shane O'Neill		(substituted off) 82'
CB	5	(Canada) Lukas MacNaughton		(substituted off) 83'
LB	44	(Italy) Domenico Criscito
CM	21	(Canada) Jonathan Osorio
CM	4	(United States) Michael Bradley (c)	(yellow card) 69'
CM	11	(Canada) Jayden Nelson		(substituted off) 88'
RW	10	(Italy) Federico Bernardeschi
CF	9	(Spain) Jesús Jiménez		(substituted off) 62'
LW	24	(Italy) Lorenzo Insigne		(substituted off) 88'
Substitutes:
GK	1	(Trinidad and Tobago) Greg Ranjitsingh
DF	7	(Canada) Jahkeele Marshall-Rutty
DF	15	(Canada) Doneil Henry		(substituted on) 82'
DF	23	(Democratic Republic of the Congo) Chris Mavinga		(substituted on) 83'
DF	38	(Canada) Luca Petrasso		(substituted on) 88'
FW	20	(Canada) Ayo Akinola		(substituted on) 62'
FW	77	(Canada) Jordan Perruzza		(substituted on) 88'
Manager: (United States) Bob Bradley

Assistant referees:
Chris Wattam
Michael Barwegen
Fourth official:
Drew Fischer
Fifth official:
Stefan Tanaka-Freundt
