= 2019 Canadian Championship final =

Final of 2019 Canadian soccer competition

- Event: 2019 Canadian Championship
Montreal Impact	Toronto FC
1	1
- on aggregate Montreal Impact won 3–1 on penalties

First leg
Montreal Impact	Toronto FC
1	0
- Date: September 18, 2019
- Venue: Saputo Stadium, Montreal, Quebec
- Man of the Match: Ignacio Piatti (Montreal Impact)
- Referee: Yusri Rudolf
- Attendance: 10,807
- Weather: Clear

Second leg
Toronto FC	Montreal Impact
1	0
- Date: September 25, 2019
- Venue: BMO Field, Toronto, Ontario
- Man of the Match: Lassi Lappalainen (Montreal Impact)
- Referee: Drew Fischer
- Attendance: 21,365
- Weather: Cloudy

The 2019 Canadian Championship final was a two-legged series to determine the winner of the 2019 Canadian Championship, Canada's primary domestic cup competition in men's soccer. The series was played between Canadian Classique rivals Montreal Impact and three-time defending champions Toronto FC, both members of Major League Soccer. It was the third time Montreal and Toronto have met in the finals since the cup format was adopted in 2011; with the Impact winning in 2014, and Toronto winning in 2017.

The first leg was hosted by the Impact at Saputo Stadium in Montreal on September 18, while the second leg was played at BMO Field in Toronto on September 25. Montreal Impact won their fourth title and first since 2014, following a 3–1 victory on penalties after both legs finished 1–0 to the home side.

As winners, Montreal qualified for the 2020 CONCACAF Champions League as Canada's sole direct entrant.

== Teams ==
Team	League	City	Previous finals appearances (bold indicates winners)
Montreal Impact	Major League Soccer	Montreal, Quebec	4 (**2013**, **2014**, 2015, 2017)
Toronto FC	Major League Soccer	Toronto, Ontario	6 (**2011**, **2012**, 2014, **2016**, **2017**, **2018**)

== Venues ==
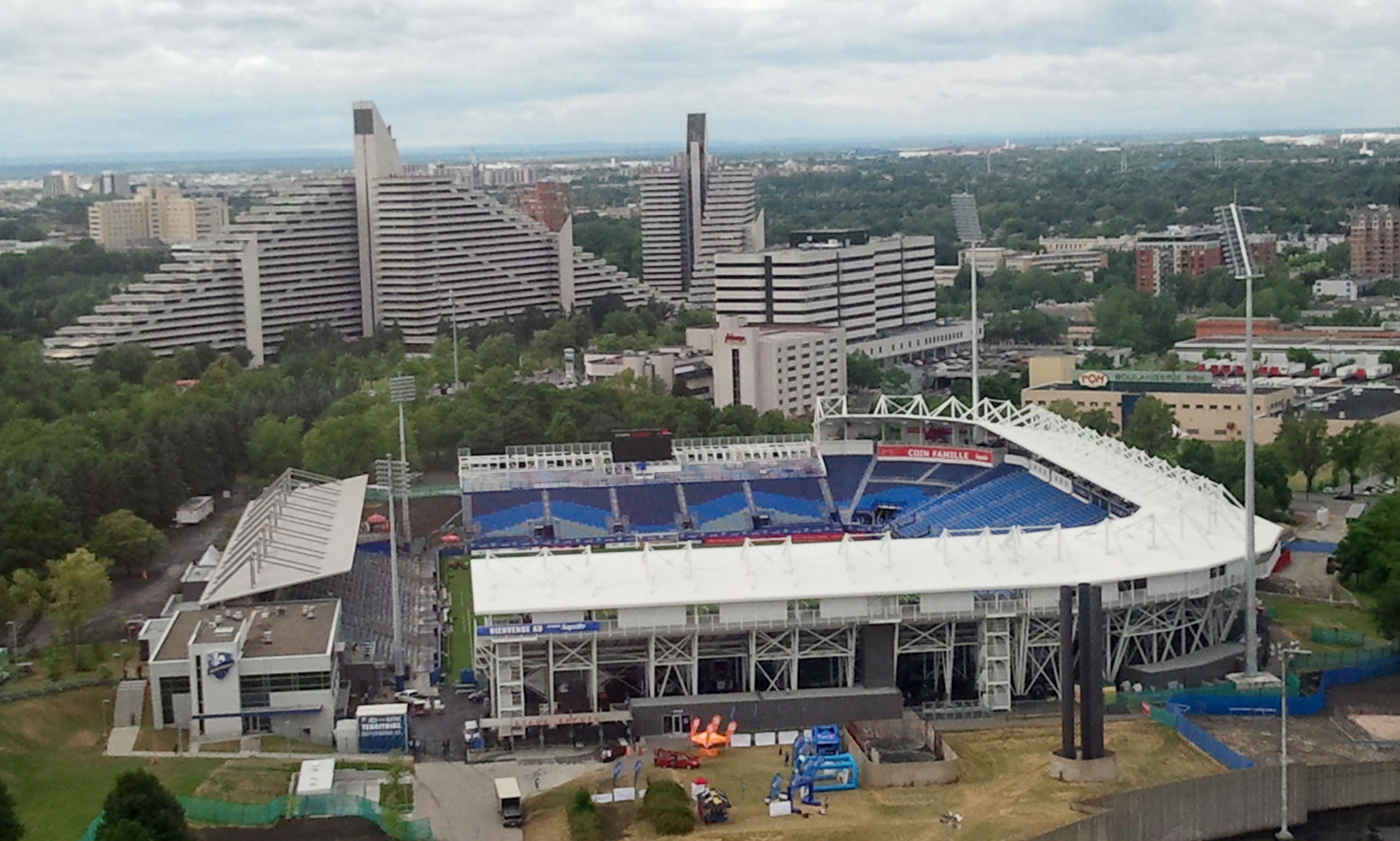
Saputo Stadium in Montreal hosted the first leg
Capacity: 19,619

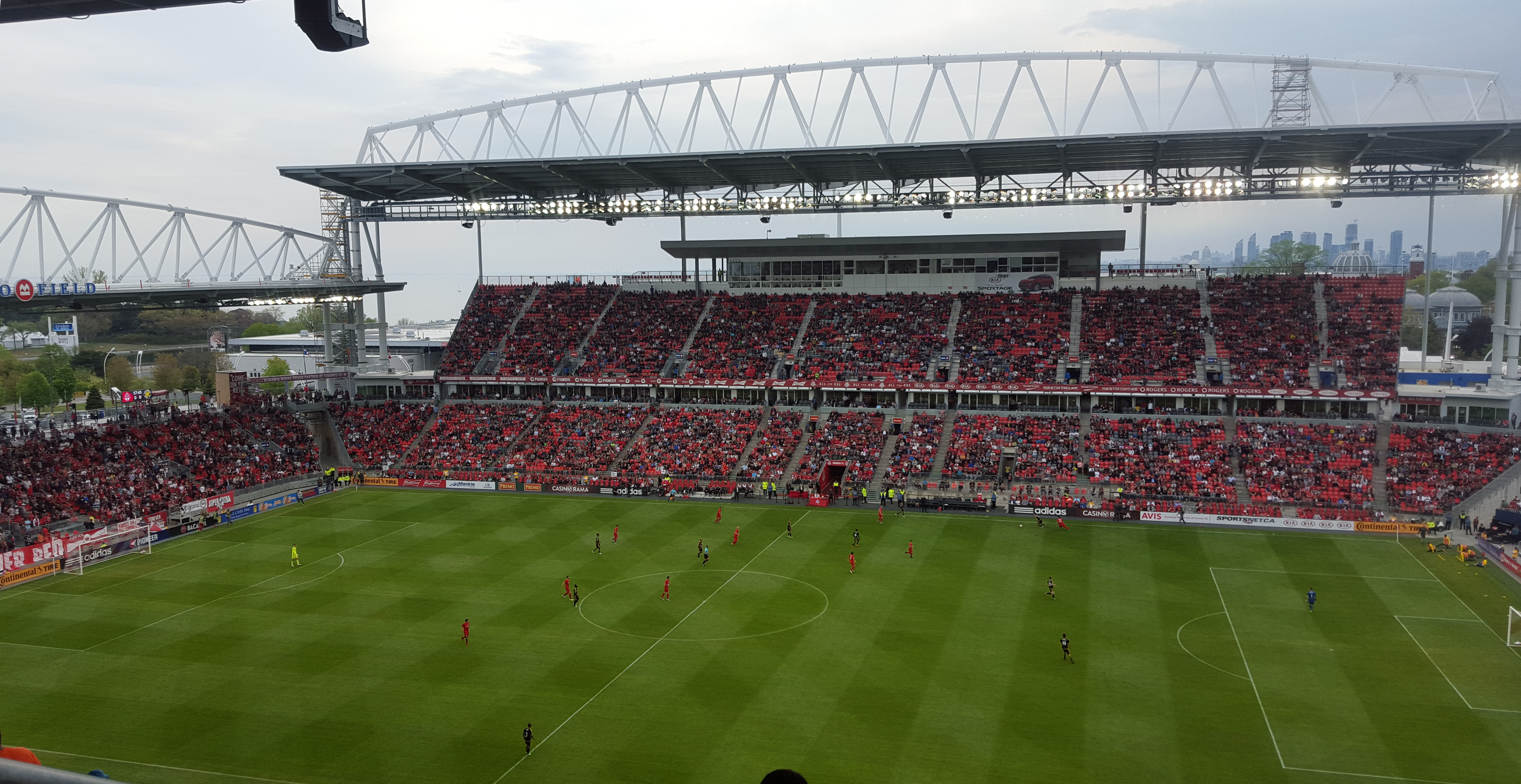
BMO Field in Toronto hosted the second leg
Capacity: 30,991

== Background ==
This was the third time Montreal Impact and Toronto FC faced one another in the Canadian Championship final. The first time, in 2014, Montreal Impact won 2–1 over two legs to win the Voyageurs Cup and advance to the 2014–15 CONCACAF Champions League. Montreal subsequently made it to the Champions League final, where they were ultimately defeated by Mexican club América.

The more recent finals meeting took place in 2017, where Toronto FC won 3–2 on aggregate. Toronto also advanced to the CONCACAF Champions League final after having qualified through the Canadian Championship, losing to Guadalajara on penalties.

=== Montreal Impact ===
Montreal Impact were drawn into the third qualifying round where they played Canadian Premier League side York9 FC from Toronto. Over two legs, they defeated York9 3–2 on aggregate to advance to the semi-finals. In the semi-finals they went on to play another CPL side, Cavalry FC from Calgary, who had just defeated fellow MLS side Vancouver Whitecaps FC to advance to play the Impact. Montreal defeated Cavalry 2–1 in Montreal, and 1–0 in Calgary for a 3–1 aggregate victory to advance to the finals.

=== Toronto FC ===
As the defending champions, Toronto FC qualified directly to the semi-finals where they played the Ottawa Fury of the USL Championship. Toronto won the first leg 2–0 in Ottawa at TD Place Stadium, followed by a 3–0 victory at home one week later August 14 to win the series 5–0 on aggregate and advance to the finals.

=== Path to the final ===
Montreal Impact				Round	Toronto FC			
Opponent	Agg.	1st leg	2nd leg	Round	Opponent	Agg.	1st leg	2nd leg
Bye				First qualifying round	Bye			
Bye				Second qualifying round	Bye			
York9 FC	3–2	2–2 (A)	1–0 (H)	Third qualifying round	Bye			
Cavalry FC	3–1	2–1 (H)	1–0 (A)	Semi-finals	Ottawa Fury FC	5–0	2–0 (A)	3–0 (H)

== Match details ==
=== First leg ===
September 18, 2019
7:30 pm EDT

Montreal Impact	1–0	Toronto FC
Piatti 17'	Report

Saputo Stadium, Montreal, Quebec
Attendance: 10,807
Referee: Yusri Rudolf

**Montreal Impact**	**Toronto FC**

GK	23	(Senegal) Clément Diop
RB	15	(Canada) Zachary Brault-Guillard
CB	33	(France) Bacary Sagna
CB	2	(Argentina) Víctor Cabrera
LB	22	(Finland) Jukka Raitala
CM	28	(Canada) Shamit Shome
CM	6	(Canada) Samuel Piette	(yellow card) 34'
RW	21	(Finland) Lassi Lappalainen		(substituted off) 77'
AM	8	(Algeria) Saphir Taïder	(yellow card) 85'
LW	10	(Argentina) Ignacio Piatti (c)
CF	9	(Spain) Bojan		(substituted off) 45+1'
Substitutes:
GK	1	(United States) Evan Bush
DF	3	(United States) Daniel Lovitz
DF	4	(France) Rudy Camacho
MF	14	(Germany) Amar Sejdič
FW	18	(Nigeria) Orji Okwonkwo		(substituted on) 77'
DF	27	(Canada) Clément Bayiha		(substituted on) 90+3'
FW	37	(Argentina) Maximiliano Urruti		(substituted on) 45+1' (substituted off) 90+3'
Manager: (Colombia) Wílmer Cabrera

GK	25	(United States) Alex Bono
RB	22	(Canada) Richie Laryea
CB	3	(United States) Drew Moor
CB	26	(Belgium) Laurent Ciman
LB	2	(United States) Justin Morrow
CM	18	(United States) Nick DeLeon
CM	4	(United States) Michael Bradley (c)
CM	21	(Canada) Jonathan Osorio
RW	9	(Venezuela) Erickson Gallardo	(substituted off) 46'
CF	13	(United States) Patrick Mullins	(substituted off) 46'
LW	24	(Canada) Jacob Shaffelburg	(substituted off) 74'
Substitutes:
GK	16	(United States) Quentin Westberg
DF	5	(Canada) Ashtone Morgan
MF	8	(United States) Mark Delgado	(substituted on) 74'
MF	10	(Spain) Alejandro Pozuelo	(substituted on) 46'
FW	17	(United States) Jozy Altidore	(substituted on) 46'
DF	44	(United States) Omar Gonzalez
DF	96	(Brazil) Auro Jr.
Manager: (United States) Greg Vanney

Man of the Match:
Ignacio Piatti (Montreal Impact)

Assistant referees:
Oscar Mitchell-Carvalho
Lyes Arfa
Fourth official:
David Gantar

=== Second leg ===
September 25, 2019
7:30 pm EDT

Toronto FC	1–0	Montreal Impact
Endoh 70'	Report
Penalties
Pozuelo (penalty scored); Altidore (penalty missed); Mullins (penalty missed); Osorio (penalty missed)	1–3	(penalty scored) Bojan; (penalty scored) Lovitz; (penalty scored) Camacho

BMO Field, Toronto, Ontario
Attendance: 21,365
Referee: Drew Fischer

**Toronto FC**	**Montreal Impact**

GK	25	(United States) Alex Bono
RB	22	(Canada) Richie Laryea		(substituted off) 61'
CB	44	(United States) Omar Gonzalez
CB	23	(Democratic Republic of the Congo) Chris Mavinga	(red card) 84'
LB	5	(Canada) Ashtone Morgan		(substituted off) 46'
CM	8	(United States) Mark Delgado
CM	4	(United States) Michael Bradley	(yellow card) 7' (c)
CM	21	(Canada) Jonathan Osorio
RW	10	(Spain) Alejandro Pozuelo
CF	17	(United States) Jozy Altidore
LW	31	(Japan) Tsubasa Endoh		(substituted off) 82'
Substitutes:
GK	16	(United States) Quentin Westberg
DF	2	(United States) Justin Morrow		(substituted on) 46'
FW	9	(Venezuela) Erickson Gallardo
FW	13	(United States) Patrick Mullins		(substituted on) 82'
MF	18	(United States) Nick DeLeon
DF	26	(Belgium) Laurent Ciman
DF	96	(Brazil) Auro Jr.		(substituted on) 61'
Manager: (United States) Greg Vanney

GK	23	(Senegal) Clément Diop
RB	33	(France) Bacary Sagna
CB	4	(France) Rudy Camacho
CB	2	(Argentina) Víctor Cabrera
LB	22	(Finland) Jukka Raitala	(substituted off) 90+1'
CM	27	(Canada) Clément Bayiha
CM	28	(Canada) Shamit Shome
CM	6	(Canada) Samuel Piette
RW	9	(Spain) Bojan
CF	37	(Argentina) Maximiliano Urruti	(substituted off) 77'
LW	10	(Argentina) Ignacio Piatti (c)
Substitutes:
GK	1	(United States) Evan Bush
DF	3	(United States) Daniel Lovitz	(substituted on) 90+1'
MF	14	(Germany) Amar Sejdič
DF	15	(Canada) Zachary Brault-Guillard
FW	18	(Nigeria) Orji Okwonkwo
FW	21	(Finland) Lassi Lappalainen	(substituted on) 77'
MF	29	(Canada) Mathieu Choinière
Manager: (Colombia) Wílmer Cabrera

Man of the Match:
Lassi Lappalainen (Montreal Impact)

Assistant referees:
Michael Barwegen
Philippe Brière
Fourth official:
Silviu Petrescu

== See also ==
- 2019 Canadian Premier League Finals
- Canadian Championship
- Canadian Classique
- Miracle in Montreal
