= 2021 Canadian Championship final =

Final of 2021 Canadian soccer competition

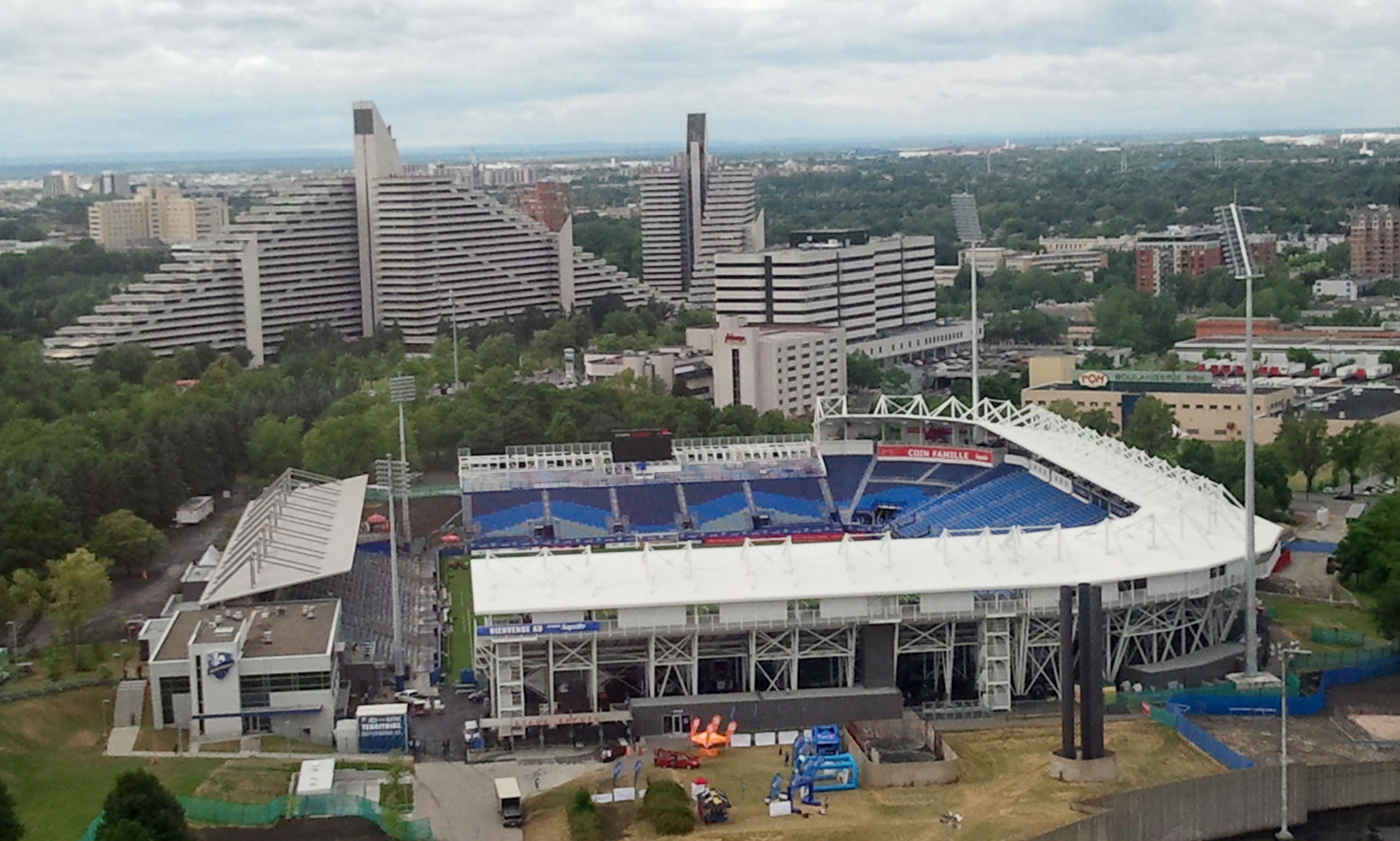
- Saputo Stadium in Montreal, Quebec hosted the match.
- Event: 2021 Canadian Championship
CF Montréal	Toronto FC
1	0
- Date: November 21, 2021
- Venue: Saputo Stadium, Montreal, Quebec
- Player of the Match: Romell Quioto (CF Montréal)
- Referee: David Gantar
- Attendance: 12,000
- Weather: Clear

The 2021 Canadian Championship final was a soccer match played between CF Montréal and Toronto FC at Saputo Stadium on November 21, 2021. The match determined the winner of the 2021 Canadian Championship, Canada's primary men's domestic cup competition. It was the 14th final in the competition's history, although it was played before the 2020 final, which was delayed over a year due to the COVID-19 pandemic. As a result, Montreal were technically the title holders as they had won the last played final in 2019.

Montreal won their fifth title following a 1–0 victory, qualifying them for the 2022 CONCACAF Champions League.

== Teams ==
Team	League	City	Previous finals appearances (bold indicates winners)
CF Montréal	Major League Soccer	Montreal, Quebec	5 (**2013**, **2014**, 2015, 2017, **2019**)
Toronto FC	Major League Soccer	Toronto, Ontario	8 (**2011**, **2012**, 2014, **2016**, **2017**, **2018**, 2019, 2020)

== Background ==
This was the fourth time CF Montréal and Toronto FC faced one another in the Canadian Championship final. The first time, in 2014, Montréal won 2–1 over two legs to win the Voyageurs Cup and advance to the 2014–15 CONCACAF Champions League. Montreal subsequently made it to the Champions League final, where they were ultimately defeated by Mexican club América.

The most recent meeting occurred in the last played final in 2019, where the teams finished tied 1–1 on aggregate and Montréal went on to win a penalty shoot-out 3–1.

=== CF Montréal ===
CF Montréal's route to the final
Round	Opposition	Score
QF	HFX Wanderers (A)	3–1
SF	Forge FC (A)	0–0 (8–7 p)
Key: (H) = home venue; (A) = away venue

CF Montréal received a bye to the quarter-finals of the competition, where they were drawn against Canadian Premier League side HFX Wanderers. The match was hosted by Halifax at the Wanderers Grounds. The Wanderers opened the scoring against the run of play in the 27th minute with a goal from Cory Bent. Matko Miljevic replied for Montréal in the 35th minute to make it 1–1 at half-time. The second half was completely dominated by Montréal as the Wanderers failed to register a shot attempt, while Montréal had 15. Nonetheless, Halifax managed to hold the 1–1 scoreline until near the end of the half, when substitute Ballou Tabla scored in the 89th minute and added a second three minutes later to secure a 3–1 win for CF Montréal.

In the semi-final, Montréal were drawn against two-time defending Canadian Premier League champions Forge FC, who hosted the match at Tim Hortons Field. In a close game, Forge succeeded in causing problems for Montréal with a high press, but both sides failed to capitalize on their scoring chances. Scoreless after 90 minutes, the match went directly to penalties. A lengthy penalty shoot-out saw all eleven players from both sides shoot once, with the match being decided after Forge goalkeeper Triston Henry missed his attempt and Montréal goalkeeper Sebastian Breza proceeded to score the winner.

=== Toronto FC ===
Toronto FC's route to the final
Round	Opposition	Score
QF	York United (H)	4–0
SF	Pacific FC (H)	2–1
Key: (H) = home venue; (A) = away venue

Toronto FC received a bye to the quarter-finals, where they were drawn against neighbouring Canadian Premier League side York United, who had dispatched League1 Ontario side Master's Futbol 5–0 in the opening round. The match was hosted by Toronto at BMO Field. TFC dominated the match, scoring two goals in the first half from Jonathan Osorio and Ifunanyachi Achara, and two in the second half from Yeferson Soteldo and Noble Okello to round out a 4–0 win.

In the semi-final, Toronto met Canadian Premier League leaders Pacific FC, who had eliminated fellow Major League Soccer side Vancouver Whitecaps FC in the preliminary round, only the second time an MLS club had been eliminated by a non-MLS club in the competition's history. This match was also played at BMO Field, and Toronto leapt out to a two-goal lead in the first 26 minutes thanks to goals from Jozy Altidore and Jacob Shaffelburg. Toronto failed to capitalize on subsequent opportunities however, and an 83rd-minute goal from Alejandro Díaz brought Pacific to within one, but TFC managed to hold on for a 2–1 win.

== Match details ==
November 21, 2021
1:00 pm EST

CF Montréal	1–0	Toronto FC
Quioto 72'	Report

Saputo Stadium, Montreal, Quebec
Attendance: 12,000
Referee: David Gantar

**CF Montréal**	**Toronto FC**

GK	1	(Canada) Sebastian Breza
CB	16	(Canada) Joel Waterman
CB	4	(France) Rudy Camacho
CB	3	(Canada) Kamal Miller
RB	15	(Canada) Zachary Brault-Guillard		(substituted off) 59'
CM	2	(Kenya) Victor Wanyama (c)
CM	7	(Egypt) Ahmed Hamdi
LB	29	(Canada) Mathieu Choinière
RW	8	(United States) Djordje Mihailovic
CF	30	(Honduras) Romell Quioto		(substituted off) 78'
LW	18	(Argentina) Joaquín Torres	(yellow card) 21'	(substituted off) 72'
Substitutes:
GK	41	(Canada) James Pantemis
MF	6	(Canada) Samuel Piette		(substituted on) 78'
FW	11	(United States) Matko Miljevic
DF	19	(Canada) Zorhan Bassong		(substituted on) 59'
MF	21	(Finland) Lassi Lappalainen		(substituted on) 72'
FW	22	(Nigeria) Sunusi Ibrahim
FW	25	(Argentina) Emanuel Maciel
Manager: (France) Wilfried Nancy

GK	16	(United States) Quentin Westberg
RB	22	(Canada) Richie Laryea	(yellow card) 36'
CB	5	(Canada) Julian Dunn
CB	4	(United States) Michael Bradley (c)
LB	23	(Democratic Republic of the Congo) Chris Mavinga
CM	8	(United States) Mark Delgado	(yellow card) 87'
CM	14	(Canada) Noble Okello		(substituted off) 78'
CM	21	(Canada) Jonathan Osorio
AM	10	(Spain) Alejandro Pozuelo		(substituted off) 16'
ST	24	(Canada) Jacob Shaffelburg		(substituted off) 78'
ST	6	(United States) Dom Dwyer		(substituted off) 78'
Substitutes:
GK	25	(United States) Alex Bono
DF	2	(United States) Justin Morrow
MF	7	(Canada) Jahkeele Marshall-Rutty
MF	18	(United States) Nick DeLeon		(substituted on) 78'
FW	30	(Venezuela) Yeferson Soteldo	(yellow card) 57'	(substituted on) 78'
FW	77	(Canada) Jordan Perruzza		(substituted on) 78'
FW	99	(Nigeria) Ifunanyachi Achara		(substituted on) 16'
Manager: (Spain) Javier Pérez

Player of the Match:
Romell Quioto (CF Montréal)

Assistant referees:
Chris Wattam
Lyes Arfa
Fourth official:
Yusri Rudolf
