= Alex Bono =

American soccer player (born 1994)

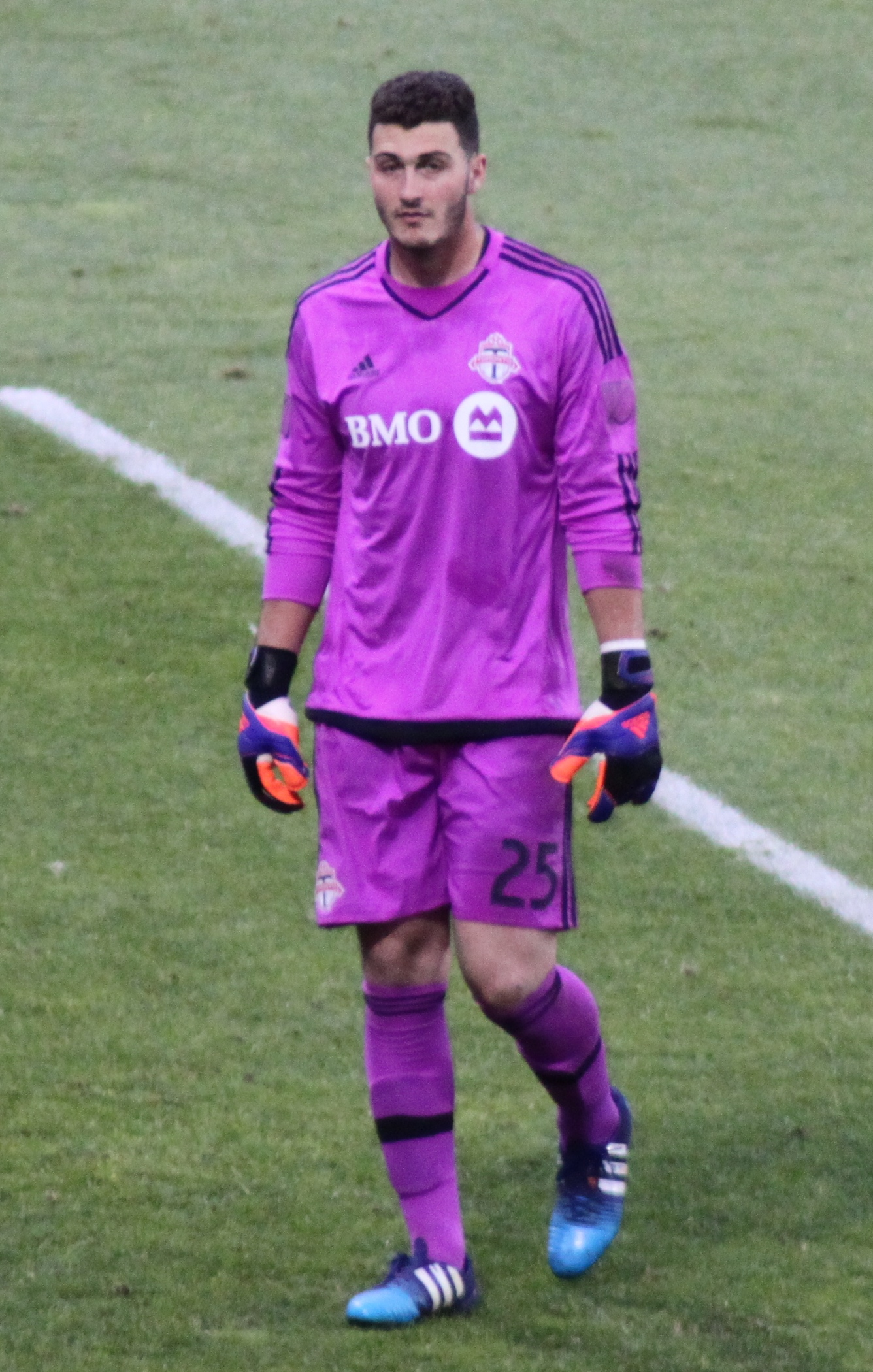
- Bono with Toronto FC in 2015

Personal information
- Full name: Alexander Nicholas Bono
- Date of birth: April 25, 1994 (age 32)
- Place of birth: Syracuse, New York, U.S.
- Height: 6 ft 3 in (1.91 m)
- Position: Goalkeeper

Team information
- Current team: D.C. United
- Number: 26

Youth career
- 2010–2012: Empire United

College career
| Years | Team | Apps | (Gls) |
| 2012–2014 | Syracuse Orange | 59 | (0) |

Senior career*
| Years | Team | Apps | (Gls) |
| 2013–2014 | Reading United | 18 | (0) |
| 2015–2022 | Toronto FC | 130 | (0) |
| 2015–2016 | → Toronto FC II (loan) | 20 | (0) |
| 2023–2024 | D.C. United | 39 | (0) |
| 2025–2026 | New England Revolution | 0 | (0) |
| 2026– | D.C. United | 2 | (0) |

International career^{‡}
| 2010–2012 | United States U18 | 7 | (0) |
| 2018 | United States | 1 | (0) |
- * Club domestic league appearances and goals as of October 31, 2026 ‡ National team caps and goals as of May 28, 2018

Alexander Nicholas Bono (born April 25, 1994) is an American professional soccer player who plays as a goalkeeper for Major League Soccer club D.C. United.

== College career ==
Born and raised in Baldwinsville, New York, Bono attended high school at Charles W. Baker High School where he was a two-year starter for the Bees. During the later years of his high school career, Bono opted to commit full-time to U.S. Soccer Development Academy club Empire United. Prior to college, Bono was seen as the top goalkeeper recruit in the state of New York, and the 51st highest prospect of his graduating high school class.

Joining Syracuse University, Bono became the immediate starter for the Syracuse Orange men's soccer program, starting in playing in 20 matches in freshman season, becoming the first true freshman goalkeeper to start a season opener since Robert Cavicchia in 2005. During his freshman year, Bono recorded a career-high eight saves during the 2012 NCAA Division I Men's Soccer Tournament against the VCU Rams on November 18, 2012, and equalled that tally on November 25 against the Georgetown Hoyas. During his freshman season, Bono was voted to the Big East Conference All-Rookie Team and was named the Orange's Rookie of the Year.

In Bono's sophomore year, he maintained similar statistics as his freshman year and was named to the Atlantic Coast Conference Third Team.

It was his junior year where Bono emerged as a potential professional prospect, as he helped the Orange earn top national rankings, and earn a ninth overall seed in the 2014 NCAA Division I Men's Soccer Tournament. In the tournament, the Orange reached the fourth round before being eliminated by Georgetown. Bono was also named a first-team All-American by the NSCAA in 2014.

== Club career ==
=== Toronto FC ===
On January 15, 2015, Bono was selected 6th overall by Toronto FC in the 2015 MLS SuperDraft. He was considered to be the highest prospective goalkeeper in the draft class.

Bono was loaned to Toronto FC II on March 20, 2015. He made his debut against the Charleston Battery on March 21.

Due to an injury to regular starter Clint Irwin in July 2016, Bono was selected to be the number one keeper for the first team by coach Greg Vanney; he went on to make 16 MLS appearances for the club that year, and also started in the second leg of the 2016 Canadian Championship final against Vancouver Whitecaps FC on June 29, which Toronto won on away goals, but Irwin later regained the starting spot for the remainder of the regular season and the Playoffs, as Toronto went on to reach the 2016 MLS Cup Final, only to be defeated at home by Seattle Sounders FC 5–4 on penalties, following a 0–0 draw after extra time.

The following season, however, after another injury to Irwin in the team's home opener in the spring, Bono was once again promoted to the starting line-up, and subsequently cemented his place as the team's outright first-choice shot-stopper by September 2017, also establishing himself as one of the best goalkeepers in the league: he broke the club's record for most clean sheets by a goalkeeper in a single season (10), and overall he kept the second highest number of clean sheets in the league season behind Stefan Frei, and won more games than any other MLS goalkeeper that season (19), while he also surpassed Frei's mark for most career MLS wins by a Toronto FC goalkeeper; furthermore, he produced 72 saves and had a 69.2 percent save percentage, averaging 1.12 goals against per game. In the post-season, Bono's performances once again proved to be decisive in his team's Playoff run, as he conceded two goals and made eight saves en route to the MLS Cup Final, keeping clean sheets in both legs of the Eastern Conference Final against Columbus Crew. On December 9, 2017, he kept a clean sheet in a 2–0 win over Seattle Sounders in the 2017 MLS Cup Final at BMO Field – a rematch of the previous season's final –, which saw Toronto complete an unprecedented treble of the MLS Cup, the Supporters' Shield, and the Canadian Championship.

After the end of the 2022 season, Bono left the club, upon the expiry of his contract.

=== D.C. United ===
On December 14, 2022, Bono signed as a free-agent with D.C. United on a one-year deal. D.C. United declined his contract option following their 2024 season.

== International career ==
On January 9, 2015, Bono was called into a training camp for the United States national team. He was called up again in March 2018. He made his senior debut on May 28, 2018, in a friendly against Bolivia at the Talen Energy Stadium, keeping a clean-sheet in the eventual 3–0 win. Alex Bono was said to be a promising prospect and a potential big impact for U.S. Soccer in the years to come.

== Career statistics ==
=== Club ===
As of match played October 31, 2026

Appearances and goals by club, season and competition
| Club | Season | League | | | Playoffs | | National cup | | Continental (Note: Includes CONCACAF Champions League, Campeones Cup and Leagues Cup) | | Total | |
| Club | Season | Division | Apps | Goals | Apps | Goals | Apps | Goals | Apps | Goals | Apps | Goals |
|---|---|---|---|---|---|---|---|---|---|---|---|---|
| Toronto FC II | 2015 | USL | 12 | 0 | — | | — | | — | | 12 | 0 |
| Toronto FC II | 2016 | USL | 8 | 0 | — | | — | | — | | 8 | 0 |
| Toronto FC II | Total | | 20 | 0 | 0 | 0 | 0 | 0 | 0 | 0 | 20 | 0 |
| Toronto FC | 2015 | Major League Soccer | 0 | 0 | 0 | 0 | 0 | 0 | — | | 0 | 0 |
| Toronto FC | 2016 | Major League Soccer | 16 | 0 | 0 | 0 | 1 | 0 | — | | 17 | 0 |
| Toronto FC | 2017 | Major League Soccer | 29 | 0 | 5 | 0 | 0 | 0 | — | | 34 | 0 |
| Toronto FC | 2018 | Major League Soccer | 27 | 0 | — | | 0 | 0 | 9 | 0 | 36 | 0 |
| Toronto FC | 2019 | Major League Soccer | 7 | 0 | 0 | 0 | 4 | 0 | 2 | 0 | 13 | 0 |
| Toronto FC | 2020 | Major League Soccer | 3 (Note: Includes one appearance in MLS is Back Tournament group stage) | 0 | 0 | 0 | 0 | 0 | — | | 3 | 0 |
| Toronto FC | 2021 | Major League Soccer | 24 | 0 | — | | 1 | 0 | 4 | 0 | 29 | 0 |
| Toronto FC | 2022 | Major League Soccer | 24 | 0 | — | | 1 | 0 | — | | 25 | 0 |
| Toronto FC | Total | | 130 | 0 | 5 | 0 | 7 | 0 | 15 | 0 | 157 | 0 |
| D.C. United | 2023 | Major League Soccer | 10 | 0 | — | | 2 | 0 | 3 | 0 | 15 | 0 |
| D.C. United | 2024 | Major League Soccer | 29 | 0 | — | | — | | 3 | 0 | 32 | 0 |
| D.C. United | Total | | 39 | 0 | 0 | 0 | 2 | 0 | 6 | 0 | 47 | 0 |
| New England Revolution | 2025 | Major League Soccer | 0 | 0 | — | | 2 | 0 | — | | 2 | 0 |
| D.C. United | 2026 | Major League Soccer | 2 | 0 | — | | 1 | 0 | — | | 3 | 0 |
| Career total | | | 191 | 0 | 5 | 0 | 12 | 0 | 21 | 0 | 229 | 0 |

=== International ===
As of match played May 28, 2018

Appearances and goals by national team and year
| National team | Year | Apps | Goals |
|---|---|---|---|
| United States | 2018 | 1 | 0 |
| Total | | 1 | 0 |

== Honors ==
Toronto FC

- MLS Cup: 2017
- Eastern Conference Winners (Playoffs): 2016, 2017, 2019
- Supporters' Shield: 2017
- Canadian Championship: 2016, 2017, 2018, 2020
