= Silviu Petrescu =

Canadian soccer referee

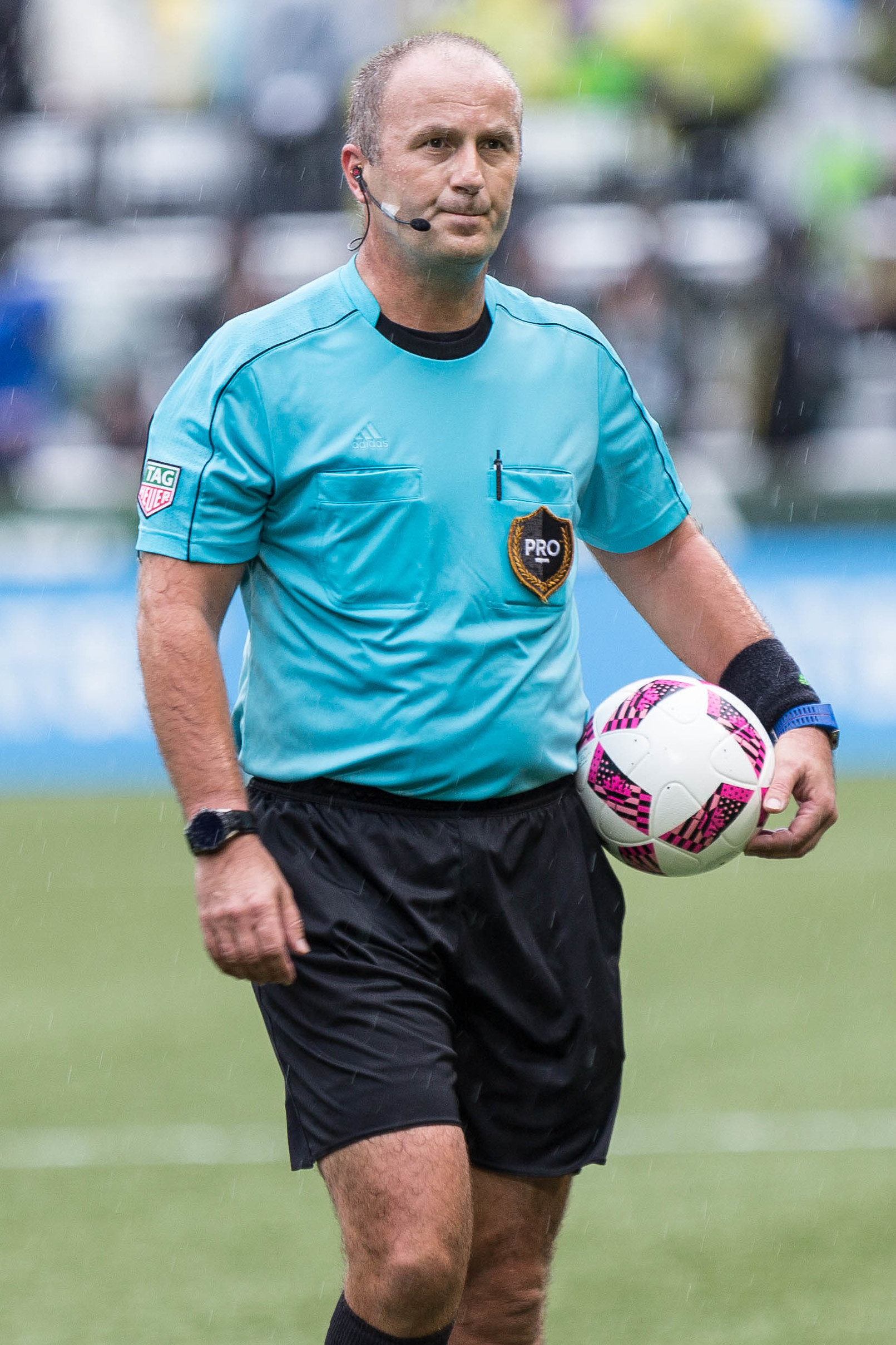
- Petrescu in 2016
- Full name: Silviu Petrescu
- Born: October 6, 1968 (age 58); Brașov, Romania
- Other occupation: Taxicab Driver

Domestic
Years	League	Role
1999	CPSL	Referee
2006–2022	MLS	Referee
2008–2022	Canadian Championship	Referee
2019–2022	Canadian Premier League	Referee

International
Years	League	Role
2002–2013	FIFA listed	Referee

Silviu Petrescu (born October 6, 1968) is a Canadian professional soccer referee. He officiates matches in the Canadian Premier League, Major League Soccer and the United Soccer League, and is a member of the Professional Referee Organization.

He was a FIFA listed referee until 2013 and officiated matches at the 2003 Pan American Games and the 2007 FIFA U-20 World Cup. He has officiated several tournament finals at the domestic level, including the 2003 Jubilee Trophy, the 2006 CIS Men's Soccer Championship, the 2012 MLS Cup, one leg at each of the 2011, 2012, 2013, 2014, 2015 and 2017 Canadian Championship finals, and the single match 2020 Canadian Championship Final.

== Career ==
Petrescu was born and raised in Brașov, Romania, where he played soccer with local side Metrom Brașov. He began working as a referee in 1986, and would officiate matches in Divizia B before emigrating to Canada in 1995. Early in his career he officiated in the Canadian Professional Soccer League, where in 1999 he was named the CPSL Referee of the Year. As a Canadian Soccer Association referee, he became FIFA listed in 2002 and has been officiating in Major League Soccer since 2006.

He has also officiated in CONCACAF tournaments along with other national and international tournaments and fixtures, from friendlies to World Cup qualifying matches. When the 2007 FIFA U-20 World Cup was held that summer in Canada, he was selected to be one of the tournament's officials.

In November 2012, Major League Soccer named Petrescu the MLS Referee of the Year, the first Canadian to win the title. Soon after it was announced that he would serve as the head referee for the MLS Cup 2012 final.

In November 2013, Petrescu officiated his final international match, a friendly between Brazil and Chile played at BMO Field in Toronto, due to a rule preventing referees over the age of 45 from remaining FIFA Listed.

Petrescu retired from professional soccer in 2022.

== Personal life ==
Silviu Petrescu's father, who was also a FIFA referee, encouraged him to become a referee rather than a professional player. He had previously played in the premier Romanian division for three years while stationed in the army.

Petrescu lives in Waterloo, Ontario, where he also works as a taxi driver, partly because it gives him the flexibility to work around his refereeing schedule.

== Honours ==
- MLS Referee of the Year: 2012
- Ray Morgan Memorial Award: 2013

== Card statistics ==
Major League Soccer
Season	G	(yellow card) Tot	(yellow card) PG	(red card) Tot	(red card) PG
2013	19	71	3.74	3	0.16
2014	15	39	2.6	0	0

Updated to matches played on November 3, 2014.
Source: http://www.proreferees.com/stats-referee-stats.php
