= Geoff Gamble (referee) =

Canadian soccer referee

- Born: March 11, 1977 (age 49); St. Catharines, Ontario, Canada
- Height: 1.80 m (5 ft 11 in)
- Other occupation: Chiropractor

Domestic
Years	League	Role
2010	CSL	Referee
2011–	MLS	Referee
2013–2017	NASL	Referee
2017	USLC	Referee

Geoff Gamble (born March 11, 1977) is a Canadian professional soccer referee and is a member of the Professional Referee Organization. He officiates in Major League Soccer in the United States and Canada.

== Career ==
Gamble began officiating at the youth level in the Niagara Soccer Association. In 2009. the Canadian Soccer Association (CSA) named him to the Canada National List of Referees. In 2010, he was named the Canadian Soccer League (CSL) Referee of the Year. He made his Major League Soccer debut on May 21, 2011. In 2013, he began officiating in the North American Soccer League. On May 30, 2019 he was involved in a match between Chicago Fire FC and D.C. United as a video assistant referee, where he was blamed for the allowance of a controversial call.

== Personal life ==
Gamble attended Brock University where he earned a Bachelor of Science degree in Biology. He is also employed as a chiropractor for the Niagara Heath and Rehab center.
