= 2016 Canadian Championship =

2016 professional soccer tournament

2016 Amway Canadian Championship (in English) Championnat Canadien Amway 2016 (in French)

Tournament details
- Country: Canada
- Dates: May 11 – June 29
- Teams: 5 (from 2 leagues)

Final positions
- Champions: Toronto FC (5th title)
- Runners-up: Vancouver Whitecaps FC

Tournament statistics
- Matches played: 8
- Goals scored: 20 (2.5 per match)
- Attendance: 114,360 (14,295 per match)
- Top goal scorer(s): Jordan Hamilton; Nicolás Mezquida; Jonathan Osorio (2 goals each)

Awards
- George Gross Memorial Trophy: Benoît Cheyrou

The 2016 Canadian Championship (officially the Amway Canadian Championship for sponsorship reasons) was a soccer tournament hosted and organized by the Canadian Soccer Association. It was the ninth edition of the annual Canadian Championship, and took place in the cities of Edmonton, Montreal, Ottawa, Toronto and Vancouver in 2016. The participating teams were Ottawa Fury FC and FC Edmonton of the second-division North American Soccer League, and the Montreal Impact, Toronto FC and Vancouver Whitecaps FC of Major League Soccer, the first-level of Canadian club soccer. The Vancouver Whitecaps were the reigning champions; having won their first title in the 2015 competition.

The winner, Toronto FC, was awarded the Voyageurs Cup and was supposed to become Canada's sole entry into the group stage of the 2017–18 CONCACAF Champions League. However, due to that tournament's restructuring, it was later announced that the Canadian representative at the 2018 CONCACAF Champions League would be determined by a playoff match between Toronto FC and the 2017 Canadian Championship winner. Toronto FC went on to win the 2017 edition, however, and qualified without the need for a playoff.

== Bracket ==
The three Major League Soccer and two NASL Canadian clubs were seeded according to their final position in 2015 league play, with both NASL clubs playing in the preliminary round, the winner of which advanced to the semi-finals.

All rounds of the competition were played via a two-leg home-and-away knock-out format. The higher seeded team had the option of deciding which leg it played at home. The team that scored the higher aggregate of goals in the two matches advanced. Toronto FC was declared champion and would have earned the right to play in a CONCACAF Champions League playoff match; however, this became no longer necessary after they also won the 2018 Canadian Championship.

Each round was a two-legged series with the away goals rule.

Preliminary round May 11–18
NASL	FC Edmonton	0	2	2
NASL	Ottawa Fury FC	3	0	3

Semi-finals; June 1–8
MLS	Toronto FC	4	0	4
MLS	Montreal Impact	2	0	2
NASL	Ottawa Fury FC	2	0	2
MLS	Vancouver Whitecaps FC	0	3	3

Final; June 21–29
MLS	Toronto FC (a)	1	1	2
MLS	Vancouver Whitecaps FC	0	2	2

== Preliminary round ==
=== Summary ===
Team 1	Agg.	Team 2	1st leg	2nd leg
FC Edmonton	2–3	Ottawa Fury FC	0–3	2–0

=== Matches ===
May 11
7:00 pm MDT (UTC−6)

FC Edmonton	0–3	Ottawa Fury FC
	Report	Timbó 13'; Haworth 69'; Vered 74'

Clarke Stadium, Edmonton, Alberta
Attendance: 3,000
Referee: Alain Ruch
May 18
7:30 pm EDT (UTC−4)

Ottawa Fury FC	0–2	FC Edmonton
	Report	Corea 26'; Eckersley 45'

TD Place Stadium, Ottawa, Ontario
Attendance: 3,946
Referee: Mathieu Bourdeau

Ottawa Fury FC won 3–2 on aggregate.

== Semi-finals ==
=== Summary ===
Team 1	Agg.	Team 2	1st leg	2nd leg
Ottawa Fury FC	2–3	Vancouver Whitecaps FC	2–0	0–3
Toronto FC	4–2	Montreal Impact	4–2	0–0

=== Matches ===
June 1
7:30 pm EDT (UTC−4)

Ottawa Fury FC	2–0	Vancouver Whitecaps FC
Steele 3'; Paulo Jr. 41'	Report

TD Place Stadium, Ottawa, Ontario
Attendance: 9,057
Referee: Yusri Rudolf
June 8
7:00 pm PDT (UTC−7)

Vancouver Whitecaps FC	3–0	Ottawa Fury FC
Morales 3' (pen.); Mezquida 20'; Rivero 52'	Report

BC Place, Vancouver, British Columbia
Attendance: 17,863
Referee: Geoff Gamble

Vancouver Whitecaps FC won 3–2 on aggregate.

June 1
7:30 pm EDT (UTC−4)

Toronto FC	4–2	Montreal Impact
Osorio 13', 36'; Hamilton 60', 80'	Report	Salazar 86'; Drogba 90+1'

BMO Field, Toronto, Ontario
Attendance: 22,143
Referee: David Gantar
June 8
7:30 pm EDT (UTC−4)

Montreal Impact	0–0	Toronto FC
	Report

Saputo Stadium, Montreal, Quebec
Attendance: 18,964
Referee: Silviu Petrescu

Toronto FC won 4–2 on aggregate.

== Final ==
=== Summary ===
Team 1	Agg.	Team 2	1st leg	2nd leg
Toronto FC	2–2 (a)	Vancouver Whitecaps FC	1–0	1–2

=== Matches ===
June 21
7:30 pm EDT (UTC−4)

Toronto FC	1–0	Vancouver Whitecaps FC
Giovinco 43'	Report

BMO Field, Toronto, Ontario
Attendance: 20,011
Referee: Mathieu Bourdeau
June 29
7:00 pm PDT (UTC−7)

Vancouver Whitecaps FC	2–1	Toronto FC
Mezquida 47'; Parker 68'	Report	Johnson 90+5'

BC Place, Vancouver, British Columbia
Attendance: 19,376
Referee: Drew Fischer

2–2 on aggregate. Toronto FC won on away goals.

== Goalscorers ==
Rank	Player	Team	Goals
1	(Canada) Jordan Hamilton	Toronto FC	2
1	(Uruguay) Nicolás Mezquida	Vancouver Whitecaps FC	2
1	(Canada) Jonathan Osorio	Toronto FC	2
4	(El Salvador) Dustin Corea	FC Edmonton	1
4	(Ivory Coast) Didier Drogba	Montreal Impact	1
4	(England) Adam Eckersley	FC Edmonton	1
4	(Italy) Sebastian Giovinco	Toronto FC	1
4	(Canada) Carl Haworth	Ottawa Fury FC	1
4	(Canada) Will Johnson	Toronto FC	1
4	(Chile) Pedro Morales	Vancouver Whitecaps FC	1
4	(United States) Tim Parker	Vancouver Whitecaps FC	1
4	(Brazil) Paulo Jr.	Ottawa Fury FC	1
4	(Uruguay) Octavio Rivero	Vancouver Whitecaps FC	1
4	(Belize) Michael Salazar	Montreal Impact	1
4	(Northern Ireland) Jonny Steele	Ottawa Fury FC	1
4	(Brazil) Fernando Timbó	Ottawa Fury FC	1
4	(Israel) Idan Vered	Ottawa Fury FC	1
