= 2012 Canadian Championship =

2012 professional soccer tournament

2012 Amway Canadian Championship (in English) Championnat Canadien Amway 2012 (in French)

Tournament details
- Country: Canada
- Date: May 2–23
- Teams: 4 (from 2 leagues)

Final positions
- Champions: Toronto FC (4th title)
- Runners-up: Vancouver Whitecaps FC

Tournament statistics
- Matches played: 6
- Goals scored: 11 (1.83 per match)
- Attendance: 75,866 (12,644 per match)
- Top goal scorer(s): Eric Hassli; Ryan Johnson; Reggie Lambe; Sébastien Le Toux (2 goals each)

Awards
- George Gross Memorial Trophy: Ryan Johnson

The 2012 Canadian Championship (officially the Amway Canadian Championship for sponsorship reasons) was a soccer tournament hosted and organized by the Canadian Soccer Association that took place in the cities of Edmonton, Montreal, Toronto and Vancouver in 2012. As in the previous tournament, participating teams included FC Edmonton, the Montreal Impact (making a first appearance since succeeding the team's previous iteration), Toronto FC and Vancouver Whitecaps FC. It was won by Toronto FC, who defeated the Vancouver Whitecaps 2–1 on aggregate in the final round. As the winner, Toronto took the Voyageurs Cup and Canada's entry into the group stage of the 2012–13 CONCACAF Champions League. It was the fifth edition of the annual Canadian Championship.

== Teams ==
Team	2011 league position	Appearance
Toronto FC	16th in MLS	5th
Vancouver Whitecaps FC	18th in MLS	2nd
FC Edmonton	5th in NASL	2nd
Montreal Impact	7th in NASL (previous iteration)	1st

== Bracket ==
The teams were seeded based on 2011 league results, with the Major League Soccer teams receiving the first and second seeds, and the North American Soccer League teams receiving the third and fourth seeds.

Each round was a two-legged series.

Semi-finals
NASL	FC Edmonton	0	1	1
MLS	Vancouver Whitecaps FC	2	3	5
MLS	Montreal Impact	0	0	0
MLS	Toronto FC	0	2	2

Final
MLS	Vancouver Whitecaps FC	1	0	1
MLS	Toronto FC	1	1	2

== Matches ==
=== Semi-finals ===
May 2
8:00 pm EDT

Montreal Impact	0–0	Toronto FC
	Report

Olympic Stadium, Montreal, Quebec
Attendance: 13,405
Referee: Paul Ward
May 9
8:00 pm EDT

Toronto FC	2–0	Montreal Impact
Lambe 2'; Johnson 38'	Report

BMO Field, Toronto, Ontario
Attendance: 15,016
Referee: David Gantar

Toronto FC won 2–0 on aggregate.

May 2
8:00 pm MDT

FC Edmonton	0–2	Vancouver Whitecaps FC
	Report	Hassli 18'; Harris 41'

Commonwealth Stadium, Edmonton, Alberta
Attendance: 3,777
Referee: Carol Anne Chénard
May 9
8:00 pm PDT

Vancouver Whitecaps FC	3–1	FC Edmonton
Le Toux 75', 88'; Mattocks 90+3'	Report	Pinto 54'

BC Place, Vancouver, British Columbia
Attendance: 15,011
Referee: Geoff Gamble

Vancouver Whitecaps FC won 5–1 on aggregate.

=== Final ===
May 16
7:00 pm PDT

Vancouver Whitecaps FC	1–1	Toronto FC
Hassli 90+1'	Report	Johnson 66'

BC Place, Vancouver, British Columbia
Attendance: 14,878
Referee: Drew Fischer
May 23
8:00 pm EDT

Toronto FC	1–0	Vancouver Whitecaps FC
Lambe 83'	Report

BMO Field, Toronto, Ontario
Attendance: 13,777
Referee: Silviu Petrescu

Toronto FC won 2–1 on aggregate.

== Goalscorers ==
Team eliminated or did not play in this round.

Rank	Player	Team	Goals	By round			
Rank	Player	Team	Goals	SF1	SF2	F1	F2
1	(France) Eric Hassli	Vancouver Whitecaps FC	2	1		1	
1	(Jamaica) Ryan Johnson	Toronto FC	2	1		1	
1	(Bermuda) Reggie Lambe	Toronto FC	2	1			1
1	(France) Sébastien Le Toux	Vancouver Whitecaps FC	2		2		
5	(Saint Kitts and Nevis) Atiba Harris	Vancouver Whitecaps FC	1	1			
5	(Jamaica) Darren Mattocks	Vancouver Whitecaps FC	1		1		
5	(Chile) Pinto	FC Edmonton	1		1		
