= David Gantar =

Canadian soccer referee

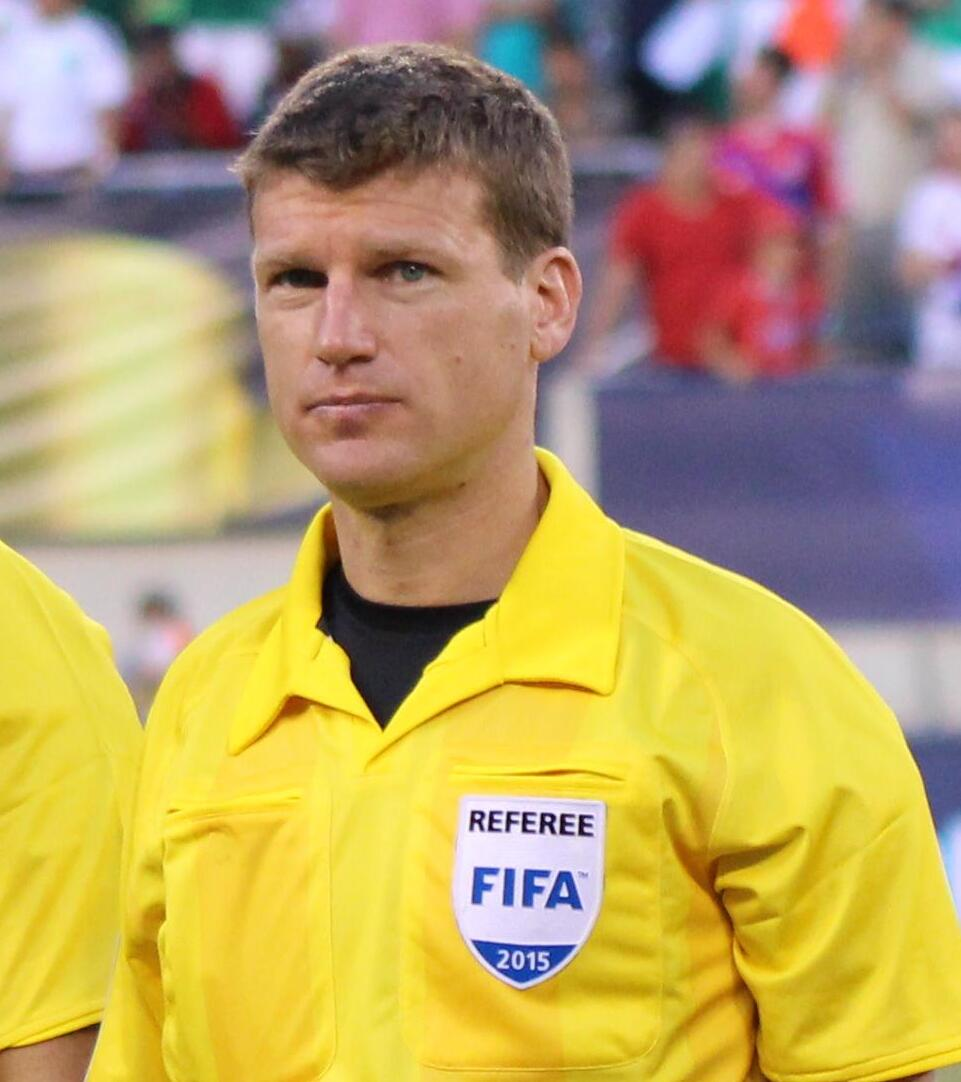
- Gantar before a 2015 CONCACAF Gold Cup match at MetLife Stadium
- Full name: David John Gantar
- Born: June 27, 1975 (age 51); Edmonton, Alberta, Canada
- Other occupation: CFO and vice president of Stanley Construction Ltd.

Domestic
Years	League	Role
2015-2021	Major League Soccer	Referee
2019–2021	Canadian Premier League	Referee

International
Years	League	Role
2011–2021	FIFA listed	Referee

David Gantar (born June 27, 1975) is a retired Canadian soccer referee from Edmonton, Alberta. He officiated as a referee for the Professional Referee Organization (PRO). He has been a Canadian National Referee since 2004, and became a FIFA Referee in 2011. Gantar had a highly successful first year of international duty, officiating at three international tournaments — including one major tournament — and in the CONCACAF Champions League and 2014 FIFA World Cup Qualification.

== Early life ==
Gantar grew up in the North Edmonton community of Kilkenny, where he played youth soccer. He completed his first referee clinic at the age of 12 and began officiating local matches. He advanced quickly through the refereeing ranks, developing a long-term interest in officiating.

== Career ==
Gantar had a successful first year as a FIFA referee, attending three international tournaments. His year included appointment to the Gold Cup (the continental championship) ahead of fellow Canadian FIFA Referee Paul Ward. The appointment came despite Ward's seniority and experience; coupled with Gantar's inclusion on CONCACAF's Elite Referee List.

He was the match referee for international friendlies involving the Brazil national team twice in 2013 and 2014, and Colombia twice in 2014. Brazil and Colombia are among the most prominent international sides he officiated.

On April 27, 2019, Gantar was the match official for the inaugural match of the Canadian Premier League.

Gantar retired following the 2021 season. His final match was the 2021 Canadian Championship Final.

His unofficial final refereeing appearance took place on June 4, 2022, at John Barnett School in the Kilkenny neighbourhood of Edmonton, Alberta—the same field where he had officiated his first match and where he grew up.

=== Off the field ===
Gantar has an MBA from the University of Alberta and is the CFO and vice president of Stanley Construction Ltd.

He is a founding member of the Grande Prairie Soccer Referees Association and the Grande Prairie Men's League.

He currently holds a position in the Professional Referee Organization as the manager of PRO2 video review.

== Tournament statistics ==
Tournament	Date	Venue	Round	Team 1	Result	Team 2	Yellow card	Red card
CONCACAF U-20 Championship	March 29	Estadio Mateo Flores, Guatemala City	Group Stage	Suriname	0 – 4	United States	2	1
CONCACAF U-20 Championship	April 8	Estadio Mateo Flores, Guatemala City	Semi-Final	Costa Rica	2 – 1	Guatemala	5	0
CONCACAF Gold Cup	June 10	(United States) FIU Stadium, Miami	Group Stage	Grenada	1 – 7	Honduras	1	0
Pan American Games	October 21	(Mexico) Estadio Omnilife, Guadalajara	Group Stage	Costa Rica	0 – 3	Argentina	5	0
Pan American Games	October 23	(Mexico) Estadio Omnilife, Guadalajara	Group Stage	Trinidad and Tobago	1 – 1	Ecuador	6	0

== Card statistics ==
Season	G	(yellow card) Tot	(yellow card) PG	(red card) Tot	(red card) PG
2010	3	7	2.33	0	0
2011	17	68	4	5	0.29
2012	3	6	2	3	1

Statistics for all competitions, including domestic, CONCACAF and international friendlies/tournaments.

== Honours ==
- Award of Excellence (Alberta Soccer Association): 2021
- Ray Morgan Memorial Award: 2018
- International Achievement Award (Canada Soccer): 2017
