= 2018 Canadian Championship =

2018 professional soccer tournament

Championnat Canadien 2018 (in French)

Tournament details
- Country: Canada
- Dates: June 6 – August 15
- Teams: 6 (from 4 leagues)

Final positions
- Champions: Toronto FC (7th title)
- Runners-up: Vancouver Whitecaps FC

Tournament statistics
- Matches played: 10
- Goals scored: 24 (2.4 per match)
- Attendance: 97,826 (9,783 per match)
- Top goal scorer(s): Jozy Altidore; Kei Kamara; Jonathan Osorio (3 goals each)

Awards
- George Gross Memorial Trophy: Jonathan Osorio

The 2018 Canadian Championship was a soccer tournament hosted and organized by the Canadian Soccer Association. It was the eleventh edition of the annual Canadian Championship. Toronto FC won the competition for the third consecutive year and qualified for the 2019 CONCACAF Champions League.

The 2018 edition saw the invitation of the champions of League1 Ontario (L1O) and Première Ligue de soccer du Québec (PLSQ). FC Edmonton suspended operations and did not take part in the Championship this year. As a result, a new format was adopted which saw the L1O and PLSQ champions, the Oakville Blue Devils and AS Blainville, enter in a new first qualifying round. As winners of the first qualifying round, AS Blainville played Ottawa Fury FC in the second qualifying round, and the winner of that match, Ottawa Fury, joined the MLS teams in the semi-final round. With six teams, the 2018 edition was the largest edition of the championship at that time.

== Teams ==
Team	Location	League	Previous best	Prior appearances
AS Blainville	Blainville, Quebec	Première Ligue de soccer du Québec	N/A	0
Montreal Impact	Montreal, Quebec	Major League Soccer	Champions: 3	10
Oakville Blue Devils	Oakville, Ontario	League1 Ontario	N/A	0
Ottawa Fury FC	Ottawa, Ontario	United Soccer League	Semi-finals: 2	4
Toronto FC	Toronto, Ontario	Major League Soccer	Champions: 6	10
Vancouver Whitecaps FC	Vancouver, British Columbia	Major League Soccer	Champions: 1	10

Statistics include previous incarnations of the Montreal Impact and Vancouver Whitecaps.

=== Distribution ===
Distribution of teams for 2018 Canadian Championship
Round	Teams entering in this round	Teams advancing from previous round
First qualifying round (2 teams)	1 champion of League1 Ontario; 1 champion of Première ligue de soccer du Québec	
Second qualifying round (2 teams)	1 United Soccer League team	1 winner from the first qualifying round
Semi-finals (4 teams)	3 Major League Soccer teams	1 winner from the second qualifying round
Final (2 teams)		2 winners from the semi-finals

== Bracket ==
First qualifying round June 6–13
L1O	Oakville Blue Devils	1	0	1
PLSQ	AS Blainville	2	1	3

Second qualifying round June 20–27
USL	Ottawa Fury FC	1	1	2
PLSQ	AS Blainville	0	0	0

Semi-finals; July 18–25
MLS	Toronto FC	1	3	4
USL	Ottawa Fury FC	0	0	0
MLS	Vancouver Whitecaps FC	0	2	2
MLS	Montreal Impact	1	0	1

Final; August 8–15
MLS	Toronto FC	2	5	7
MLS	Vancouver Whitecaps FC	2	2	4

== First qualifying round ==
=== Summary ===
Team 1	Agg.	Team 2	1st leg	2nd leg
AS Blainville	3–1	Oakville Blue Devils	2–1	1–0

=== Matches ===
June 6
7:30 pm EDT

AS Blainville	2–1	Oakville Blue Devils
Syla 26'; Mayard 90'	Report	Novak 40'

Stade Desjardins, Laval, Quebec
Attendance: 1,550
Referee: Fabrizio Stasolla
June 13
7:30 pm EDT

Oakville Blue Devils	0–1	AS Blainville
	Report	Abzi 45'

Ontario Soccer Centre, Vaughan, Ontario
Attendance: 1,226
Referee: Juan Marquez

AS Blainville won 3–1 on aggregate.

== Second qualifying round ==
=== Summary ===
Team 1	Agg.	Team 2	1st leg	2nd leg
AS Blainville	0–2	Ottawa Fury FC	0–1	0–1

=== Matches ===
June 20
7:30 pm EDT

AS Blainville	0–1	Ottawa Fury FC
	Report	Taylor 1'

Stade Desjardins, Laval, Quebec
Attendance: 1,800
Referee: Alain Ruch
June 27
7:30 pm EDT

Ottawa Fury FC	1–0	AS Blainville
Haworth 21'	Report

TD Place Stadium, Ottawa, Ontario
Attendance: 3,915
Referee: Juan Marquez

Ottawa Fury FC won 2–0 on aggregate.

== Semi-finals ==
=== Summary ===
Team 1	Agg.	Team 2	1st leg	2nd leg
Ottawa Fury FC	0–4	Toronto FC	0–1	0–3
Montreal Impact	1–2	Vancouver Whitecaps FC	1–0	0–2

=== Matches ===
July 18
7:30 pm EDT

Ottawa Fury FC	0–1	Toronto FC
	Report	Osorio 5'

TD Place Stadium, Ottawa, Ontario
Attendance: 6,057
Referee: Silviu Petrescu
July 25
7:30 pm EDT

Toronto FC	3–0	Ottawa Fury FC
Akinola 36'; Hamilton 76'; Osorio 84'	Report

BMO Field, Toronto, Ontario
Attendance: 18,795
Referee: Pierre-Luc Lauzière

Toronto FC won 4–0 on aggregate.

July 18
7:30 pm EDT

Montreal Impact	1–0	Vancouver Whitecaps FC
Silva 58'	Report

Saputo Stadium, Montreal, Quebec
Attendance: 13,389
Referee: Yusri Rudolf
July 25
7:00 pm PDT

Vancouver Whitecaps FC	2–0	Montreal Impact
Reyna 19'; Kamara 60' (pen.)	Report

BC Place, Vancouver, British Columbia
Attendance: 19,267
Referee: David Barrie

Vancouver Whitecaps FC won 2–1 on aggregate.

== Final ==
=== Summary ===
Team 1	Agg.	Team 2	1st leg	2nd leg
Vancouver Whitecaps FC	4–7	Toronto FC	2–2	2–5

=== Matches ===
August 8, 2018
7:00 pm PDT

Vancouver Whitecaps FC	2–2	Toronto FC
Kamara 24' (pen.); Hurtado 84'	Report	Osorio 26'; Henry 90+6' (o.g.)

BC Place, Vancouver, British Columbia
Attendance: 16,833
Referee: David Gantar
August 15, 2018
7:30 pm EDT

Toronto FC	5–2	Vancouver Whitecaps FC
Altidore 39', 49', 53'; Giovinco 44'; Ricketts 80'	Report	Kamara 63'; Shea 77'

BMO Field, Toronto, Ontario
Attendance: 14,994
Referee: Drew Fischer

Toronto FC won 7–4 on aggregate.

== Goalscorers ==
Team eliminated or did not play in this round.

Rank	Player	Team	Goals	By round							
Rank	Player	Team	Goals	1Q1	1Q2	2Q1	2Q2	SF1	SF2	F1	F2
1	(United States) Jozy Altidore	Toronto FC	3								3
1	(Canada) Jonathan Osorio	Toronto FC	3					1	1	1	
1	(Sierra Leone) Kei Kamara	Vancouver Whitecaps FC	3						1	1	1
4	(Canada) Diyaeddine Abzi	AS Blainville	1		1						
4	(United States) Ayo Akinola	Toronto FC	1						1		
4	(Italy) Sebastian Giovinco	Toronto FC	1								1
4	(Canada) Jordan Hamilton	Toronto FC	1						1		
4	(Canada) Carl Haworth	Ottawa Fury FC	1				1				
4	(United States) Erik Hurtado	Vancouver Whitecaps FC	1							1	
4	(Canada) Pierre-Rudolph Mayard	AS Blainville	1	1							
4	(Canada) Anthony Novak	Oakville Blue Devils	1	1							
4	(Peru) Yordy Reyna	Vancouver Whitecaps FC	1						1		
4	(Canada) Tosaint Ricketts	Toronto FC	1								1
4	(United States) Brek Shea	Vancouver Whitecaps FC	1								1
4	(Uruguay) Alejandro Silva	Montreal Impact	1					1			
4	(Canada) Mitchell Syla	AS Blainville	1	1							
4	(Panama) Tony Taylor	Ottawa Fury FC	1			1					
