= 2017 Canadian Championship =

2017 professional soccer tournament

Championnat Canadien 2017 (in French)

Tournament details
- Country: Canada
- Dates: May 3 – June 27
- Teams: 5 (from 3 leagues)

Final positions
- Champions: Toronto FC (6th title)
- Runners-up: Montreal Impact

Tournament statistics
- Matches played: 8
- Goals scored: 27 (3.38 per match)
- Attendance: 101,856 (12,732 per match)
- Top goal scorer(s): Sebastian Giovinco (3 goals)

Awards
- George Gross Memorial Trophy: Sebastian Giovinco

The 2017 Canadian Championship was a soccer tournament hosted and organized by the Canadian Soccer Association. It was the tenth edition of the annual Canadian Championship.

The 2017 edition saw the introduction of a rule that required three players to be named in the starting eleven of each participating team who are eligible (and have declared their intention, if they had otherwise played for another national team) to play for the Canada men's national soccer team.

Due to the restructuring of the CONCACAF Champions League, the winner of the 2017 Canadian Championship would have advanced to a playoff against Toronto FC, the winner of the 2016 Canadian Championship, to be played in Toronto on August 9, 2017, for a place in the 2018 CONCACAF Champions League. However, as Toronto FC won the 2017 Canadian Championship, no playoff game was necessary, and Toronto earned a place in the 2018 CONCACAF Champions League automatically.

== Bracket ==
Preliminary round May 3–10
USL	Ottawa Fury FC	1	3	4
NASL	FC Edmonton	0	2	2

Semi-finals; May 23–31
MLS	Vancouver Whitecaps FC	2	2	4
MLS	Montreal Impact	1	4	5
USL	Ottawa Fury FC	2	0	2
MLS	Toronto FC	1	4	5

Final; June 21–27
MLS	Montreal Impact	1	1	2
MLS	Toronto FC	1	2	3

== Preliminary round ==
=== Summary ===
Team 1	Agg.	Team 2	1st leg	2nd leg
Ottawa Fury FC	4–2	FC Edmonton	1–0	3–2

=== Matches ===
May 3
7:30 pm EDT

Ottawa Fury FC	1–0	FC Edmonton
Williams 89'	Report

TD Place Stadium, Ottawa, Ontario
Attendance: 2,567
Referee: Juan Marquez
May 10
7:00 pm MDT

FC Edmonton	2–3	Ottawa Fury FC
Keegan 30'; Nyassi 61'	Report	Seoane 1'; Dos Santos 37' (pen.), 90+4'

Clarke Stadium, Edmonton, Alberta
Attendance: 2,591
Referee: David Barrie

Ottawa Fury FC won 4–2 on aggregate.

== Semi-finals ==
=== Summary ===
Team 1	Agg.	Team 2	1st leg	2nd leg
Ottawa Fury FC	2–5	Toronto FC	2–1	0–4
Vancouver Whitecaps FC	4–5	Montreal Impact	2–1	2–4

=== Matches ===
May 23
7:00 pm EDT

Ottawa Fury FC	2–1	Toronto FC
Williams 57' (pen.); Seoane 72'	Report	Cheyrou 35'

TD Place Stadium, Ottawa, Ontario
Attendance: 7,611
Referee: Pierre-Luc Lauzière
May 31
7:00 pm EDT

Toronto FC	4–0	Ottawa Fury FC
Edward 41' (o.g.); Endoh 42'; Delgado 80'; Giovinco 85'	Report

BMO Field, Toronto, Ontario
Attendance: 15,175
Referee: Geoff Gamble

Toronto FC won 5–2 on aggregate.

May 23
7:00 pm PDT

Vancouver Whitecaps FC	2–1	Montreal Impact
Davies 13'; Mezquida 33'	Report	Choinière 62'

BC Place, Vancouver, British Columbia
Attendance: 16,831
Referee: Drew Fischer
May 30
7:30 pm EDT

Montreal Impact	4–2	Vancouver Whitecaps FC
Piatti 20' (pen.), 28' (pen.); Džemaili 38'; Jackson-Hamel 61'	Report	Davies 59'; Greig 77'

Saputo Stadium, Montreal, Quebec
Attendance: 15,213
Referee: David Barrie

Montreal Impact won 5–4 on aggregate.

== Final ==
=== Summary ===
Team 1	Agg.	Team 2	1st leg	2nd leg
Montreal Impact	2–3	Toronto FC	1–1	1–2

=== Matches ===
June 21
7:30 pm EDT

Montreal Impact	1–1	Toronto FC
Mancosu 19'	Report	Altidore 30'

Saputo Stadium, Montreal, Quebec
Attendance: 14,329
Referee: Silviu Petrescu
June 27
7:30 pm EDT

Toronto FC	2–1	Montreal Impact
Giovinco 53', 90+5'	Report	Tabla 36'

BMO Field, Toronto, Ontario
Attendance: 26,539
Referee: David Gantar

Toronto FC won 3–2 on aggregate.

== Goalscorers ==
Rank	Player	Team	Goals
1	(Italy) Sebastian Giovinco	Toronto FC	3
2	(Canada) Alphonso Davies	Vancouver Whitecaps FC	2
2	(Cape Verde) Steevan Dos Santos	Ottawa Fury FC	2
2	(Argentina) Ignacio Piatti	Montreal Impact	2
2	(United States) Sito Seoane	Ottawa Fury FC	2
2	(England) Ryan Williams	Ottawa Fury FC	2
7	(United States) Jozy Altidore	Toronto FC	1
7	(France) Benoît Cheyrou	Toronto FC	1
7	(Canada) David Choinière	Montreal Impact	1
7	(United States) Mark Delgado	Toronto FC	1
7	(Switzerland) Blerim Džemaili	Montreal Impact	1
7	(Japan) Tsubasa Endoh	Toronto FC	1
7	(United States) Kyle Greig	Vancouver Whitecaps FC	1
7	(Canada) Anthony Jackson-Hamel	Montreal Impact	1
7	(United States) Jake Keegan	FC Edmonton	1
7	(Italy) Matteo Mancosu	Montreal Impact	1
7	(Uruguay) Nicolás Mezquida	Vancouver Whitecaps FC	1
7	(The Gambia) Sainey Nyassi	FC Edmonton	1
7	(Canada) Ballou Tabla	Montreal Impact	1
