= 2015 Canadian Championship =

2015 professional soccer tournament

2015 Amway Canadian Championship (in English) Championnat Canadien Amway 2015 (in French)

Tournament details
- Country: Canada
- Dates: April 22 – August 26
- Teams: 5

Final positions
- Champions: Vancouver Whitecaps FC (1st title)
- Runners-up: Montreal Impact

Tournament statistics
- Matches played: 8
- Goals scored: 25 (3.13 per match)
- Attendance: 88,944 (11,118 per match)
- Top goal scorer: Tomi Ameobi (4 goals)

Awards
- George Gross Memorial Trophy: Russell Teibert

The 2015 Canadian Championship (officially the Amway Canadian Championship for sponsorship reasons) was a soccer tournament hosted and organized by the Canadian Soccer Association. It was the eighth edition of the annual Canadian Championship, and took place in the cities of Edmonton, Montreal, Ottawa, Toronto and Vancouver in 2015. The participating teams were Ottawa Fury FC and FC Edmonton of the North American Soccer League, the second-level of the Canadian Soccer Pyramid, and the Montreal Impact, Toronto FC and Vancouver Whitecaps FC of Major League Soccer, the first-level of Canadian club soccer. The Montreal Impact were the two-time defending champions.

The winners, Vancouver Whitecaps FC, were awarded the Voyageurs Cup and qualified for the group stage of the 2016–17 CONCACAF Champions League. This was a permanent change from procedure used in the past, where the Canadian Champion qualified for the CONCACAF Champions League beginning the same year (in this case, 2015–16).

The tournament moved to an April–August timeframe from its usual April–June timeframe to accommodate the schedule of the 2015 FIFA Women's World Cup held in Canada. It was permanently moved to a June/July timeframe in 2016.

== Teams ==
Team	2014 league position	Appearance
Vancouver Whitecaps FC	9th in MLS	5th
Toronto FC	13th in MLS	8th
Montreal Impact	19th in MLS	4th
Ottawa Fury FC	6th in NASL	1st
FC Edmonton	9th in NASL	5th

== Bracket ==
The three Major League Soccer and two NASL Canadian clubs were seeded according to their final position in 2014 league play, with both NASL clubs playing in the preliminary round, the winner of which advanced to the semi-finals.

All rounds of the competition were played via a two-leg home-and-away knock-out format. The higher seeded team had the option of deciding which leg they played at home. The team that scored the higher aggregate of goals in the two matches advanced. The team that won the final on aggregate, Vancouver Whitecaps FC, was declared champion and earned the right to represent Canada in the 2016–17 CONCACAF Champions League.

Each round was a two-legged series with the away goals rule.

Preliminary round April 22–29
NASL	FC Edmonton	3	3	6
NASL	Ottawa Fury FC	1	1	2

Semi-finals; May 6–20
NASL	FC Edmonton (Note: Although Vancouver was originally scheduled to host the second leg, the order of legs were reversed as heavy snow caused the match in Edmonton to be postponed.)	1	1	2
MLS	Vancouver Whitecaps FC	1	2	3
MLS	Toronto FC	0	3	3
MLS	Montreal Impact (a)	1	2	3

Final; August 12–26
MLS	Vancouver Whitecaps FC	2	2	4
MLS	Montreal Impact	2	0	2

== Preliminary round ==
=== Summary ===
Team 1	Agg.	Team 2	1st leg	2nd leg
Ottawa Fury FC	2–6	FC Edmonton	1–3	1–3

=== Matches ===
April 22
7:30 pm EDT

Ottawa Fury FC	1–3	FC Edmonton
Oliver 1'	Report	Fordyce 83'; Laing 87'; Ameobi 90+4'

TD Place Stadium, Ottawa, Ontario
Attendance: 2,402
Referee: Geoff Gamble
April 29
8:00 pm MDT

FC Edmonton	3–1	Ottawa Fury FC
Ameobi 9'; Nyassi 15'; Fordyce 81' (pen.)	Report	Wiedeman 32'

Clarke Stadium, Edmonton, Alberta
Attendance: 1,858
Referee: Drew Fischer

FC Edmonton won 6–2 on aggregate.

== Semi-finals ==
=== Summary ===
Team 1	Agg.	Team 2	1st leg	2nd leg
Montreal Impact	3–3 (a)	Toronto FC	1–0	2–3
Vancouver Whitecaps FC	3–2	FC Edmonton	1–1	2–1

=== Matches ===
May 6
7:30 pm EDT

Montreal Impact	1–0	Toronto FC
McInerney 68'	Report

Saputo Stadium, Montreal, Quebec
Attendance: 12,518
Referee: Silviu Petrescu
May 13
7:30 pm EDT

Toronto FC	3–2	Montreal Impact
Altidore 22'; Cheyrou 56'; Giovinco 58'	Report	Cooper 25'; Oduro 84'

BMO Field, Toronto, Ontario
Attendance: 21,069
Referee: Mathieu Bourdeau

3–3 on aggregate. Montreal Impact won on away goals.

May 13
7:00 pm PDT

Vancouver Whitecaps FC	1–1	FC Edmonton
Koffie 87'	Report	Ameobi 4'

BC Place, Vancouver, British Columbia
Attendance: 15,283
Referee: David Gantar
May 20
8:00 pm MDT

FC Edmonton	1–2	Vancouver Whitecaps FC
Ameobi 90+1' (pen.)	Report	Morales 9' (pen.); Laba 90+7'

Clarke Stadium, Edmonton, Alberta
Attendance: 3,803
Referee: Silviu Petrescu

Vancouver Whitecaps FC won 3–2 on aggregate.

1. FC Edmonton had originally been scheduled to host the first leg of the semi-finals against Vancouver in Edmonton on May 6, but the match was postponed due to snow.

== Final ==
=== Summary ===
Team 1	Agg.	Team 2	1st leg	2nd leg
Montreal Impact	2–4	Vancouver Whitecaps FC	2–2	0–2

=== Matches ===
August 12
7:30 pm EDT

Montreal Impact	2–2	Vancouver Whitecaps FC
Ciman 84'; Jackson-Hamel 85'	Report	Mattocks 65'; Morales 72'

Saputo Stadium, Montreal, Quebec
Attendance: 12,395
Referee: David Gantar
August 26
7:00 pm PDT

Vancouver Whitecaps FC	2–0	Montreal Impact
Rivero 40'; Parker 53'	Report

BC Place, Vancouver, British Columbia
Attendance: 19,616
Referee: Silviu Petrescu

Vancouver Whitecaps FC won 4–2 on aggregate.

== Goalscorers ==
Rank	Player	Team	Goals
1	(England) Tomi Ameobi	FC Edmonton	4
2	(Northern Ireland) Daryl Fordyce	FC Edmonton	2
2	(Chile) Pedro Morales	Vancouver Whitecaps FC	2
4	(United States) Jozy Altidore	Toronto FC	1
4	(France) Benoît Cheyrou	Toronto FC	1
4	(Belgium) Laurent Ciman	Montreal Impact	1
4	(United States) Kenny Cooper	Montreal Impact	1
4	(Italy) Sebastian Giovinco	Toronto FC	1
4	(Canada) Anthony Jackson-Hamel	Montreal Impact	1
4	(Ghana) Gershon Koffie	Vancouver Whitecaps FC	1
4	(Argentina) Matías Laba	Vancouver Whitecaps FC	1
4	(Jamaica) Lance Laing	FC Edmonton	1
4	(Jamaica) Darren Mattocks	Vancouver Whitecaps FC	1
4	(United States) Jack McInerney	Montreal Impact	1
4	(The Gambia) Sainey Nyassi	FC Edmonton	1
4	(Ghana) Dominic Oduro	Montreal Impact	1
4	(Brazil) Oliver	Ottawa Fury FC	1
4	(United States) Tim Parker	Vancouver Whitecaps FC	1
4	(Uruguay) Octavio Rivero	Vancouver Whitecaps FC	1
4	(United States) Andrew Wiedeman	Ottawa Fury FC	1
