= Tsubasa Endoh =

Japanese footballer

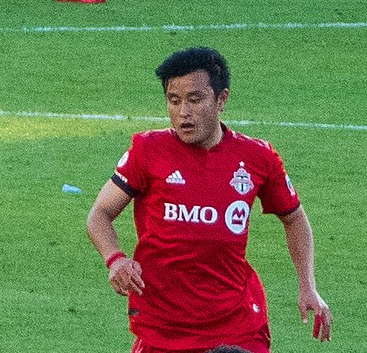
- Endoh playing for Toronto FC in 2020

Personal information
- Date of birth: 20 August 1993 (age 33)
- Place of birth: Tokyo, Japan
- Height: 1.70 m (5 ft 7 in)
- Positions: Winger; second striker

Youth career
- 2005–2012: JFA Academy Fukushima

College career
Years	Team	Apps	(Gls)
2012–2015	Maryland Terrapins	85	(12)

Senior career*
Years	Team	Apps	(Gls)
2016–2017	Toronto FC	25	(2)
2017	→ Toronto FC II (loan)	14	(3)
2018	Toronto FC II	14	(8)
2019–2021	Toronto FC	41	(5)
2019	→ Toronto FC II (loan)	6	(0)
2022	Melbourne City	5	(0)
2022	LA Galaxy II	3	(2)
Total		108	(20)

International career^{‡}
- Japan U15
- Japan U16
- Japan U17
- * Club domestic league appearances and goals as of 22 October 2022 ‡ National team caps and goals as of 6 March 2016

Tsubasa Endoh (遠藤 翼, Endō Tsubasa; born 20 August 1993) is a Japanese former professional footballer who played as a forward.

== College career ==
Endoh played four years with Maryland Terrapins at the University of Maryland. In 2016, he attended the MLS Combine for draft-eligible players ahead of the 2016 MLS SuperDraft, where he was named MVP.

== Club career ==
Endoh was drafted as the ninth overall pick in the 2016 MLS SuperDraft by Toronto FC and signed with the club on 27 February 2016. He made his professional debut on 6 March 2016 against the New York Red Bulls. He scored his first MLS goal on 7 May 2016, in Toronto FC's home opener against FC Dallas, at the newly renovated BMO Field, which ended in a 1–0 victory. At the end of 2017, he was released by the club, who declined to exercise their contract option on him.

In 2018, he went on a month-long trial with Belgian second division club KFCO Beerschot Wilrijk, but was not offered a contract and returned to Canada. On 2 August 2018, after not being offered a first-team deal, Endoh signed a USL contract with the second-team Toronto FC II. He made an immediate impact, scoring two goals and adding an assist in his fifth game back against Louisville City. He followed that up in his eighth game when he scored a hat trick against FC Cincinnati, his first career hat trick as a professional.

On 16 January 2019, Endoh rejoined Toronto's first team in Major League Soccer, signing an MLS contract. He made his first appearance of the season for Toronto on 26 June 2019, scoring the fastest goal in club history, only 29 seconds into the game against Atlanta United; Toronto went on to win the game 3–2.

In January 2022, Endoh signed a six month contract with Australian club Melbourne City in the A-League.

In August 2022, he joined LA Galaxy II in the USL Championship, scoring two goals on his debut on 27 August against Monterey Bay FC.

In July 2025, after being unable to play for the previous three years due to his battle with acute leukemia, he signed a one-day contract with Toronto FC, in order to announce his retirement from football with the club.

== International career ==
Endoh has represented Japan at the U15 through U17 levels.

== Personal life ==
From 2005 to 2011, Endo was part of the Japan Football Association Academy in Fukushima. Forced to leave after the Fukushima earthquake, he moved to the United States in 2011, going to the University of Maryland. Since leaving Japan he has learned to speak English, a language he could not speak well in 2011. He was said to make some alleged inappropriate comments.

In December 2022, Endo was diagnosed with Acute Undifferentiated Leukemia. He underwent multiple rounds of chemotherapy, followed by six sessions of radiation therapy and high-dose chemotherapy in preparation for a bone marrow transplant. After a successful transplant in March 2023, he was discharged from the hospital in mid-May and began training in hopes of returning to professional football.

However, a relapse later that year led to further treatment, including additional chemotherapy and four rounds of donor lymphocyte infusions (DLI). While the treatment suppressed cancer cell activity, Endo developed severe chronic graft-versus-host disease (GVHD), a complication that significantly impacted his physical condition.

As part of his treatment for GVHD, he underwent over 30 sessions of Extracorporeal Photochemotherapy (ECP), which helped reduce his reliance on steroids. Despite ongoing medical management, including a third-line treatment initiated in April 2024, the persistent effects of chronic GVHD—such as widespread inflammation and muscle stiffness—made it increasingly difficult to maintain the physical demands of professional football.

In 2025, Endo made the difficult decision to retire from professional play due to his ongoing battle with chronic GVHD.

== Career statistics ==
=== Club ===
As of 14 September 2021

Club	Season	League			Playoffs		National Cup		Continental		Other		Total	
Club	Season	Division	Apps	Goals	Apps	Goals	Apps	Goals	Apps	Goals	Apps	Goals	Apps	Goals
Toronto FC	2016	MLS	21	2	0	0	2	0	—		—		23	2
Toronto FC	2017	MLS	4	0	0	0	2	1	—		—		6	1
Toronto FC	Total		25	2	0	0	4	1	—		—		29	3
Toronto FC II	2017	USL Championship	14	3	—		—		—		—		14	3
Toronto FC II	2018	USL Championship	14	8	—		—		—		—		14	8
Toronto FC II	2019	USL League One	6	0	—		—		—		—		6	0
Toronto FC II	Total		34	11	—		—		—		—		34	11
Toronto FC	2019	MLS	13	3	4	0	3	2	1	0	—		21	5
Toronto FC	2020	MLS	17 (Note: Includes three appearances in the MLS is Back Tournament group stage.)	1	0	0	0	0	—		0	0	17	1
Toronto FC	2021	MLS	11	1	—		0	0	2	0	—		13	1
Toronto FC	Total		41	5	4	0	3	2	3	0	0	0	51	7
Career total			100	18	3	0	8	3	3	0	0	0	114	21
