= Jozy Altidore =

American soccer player (born 1989)

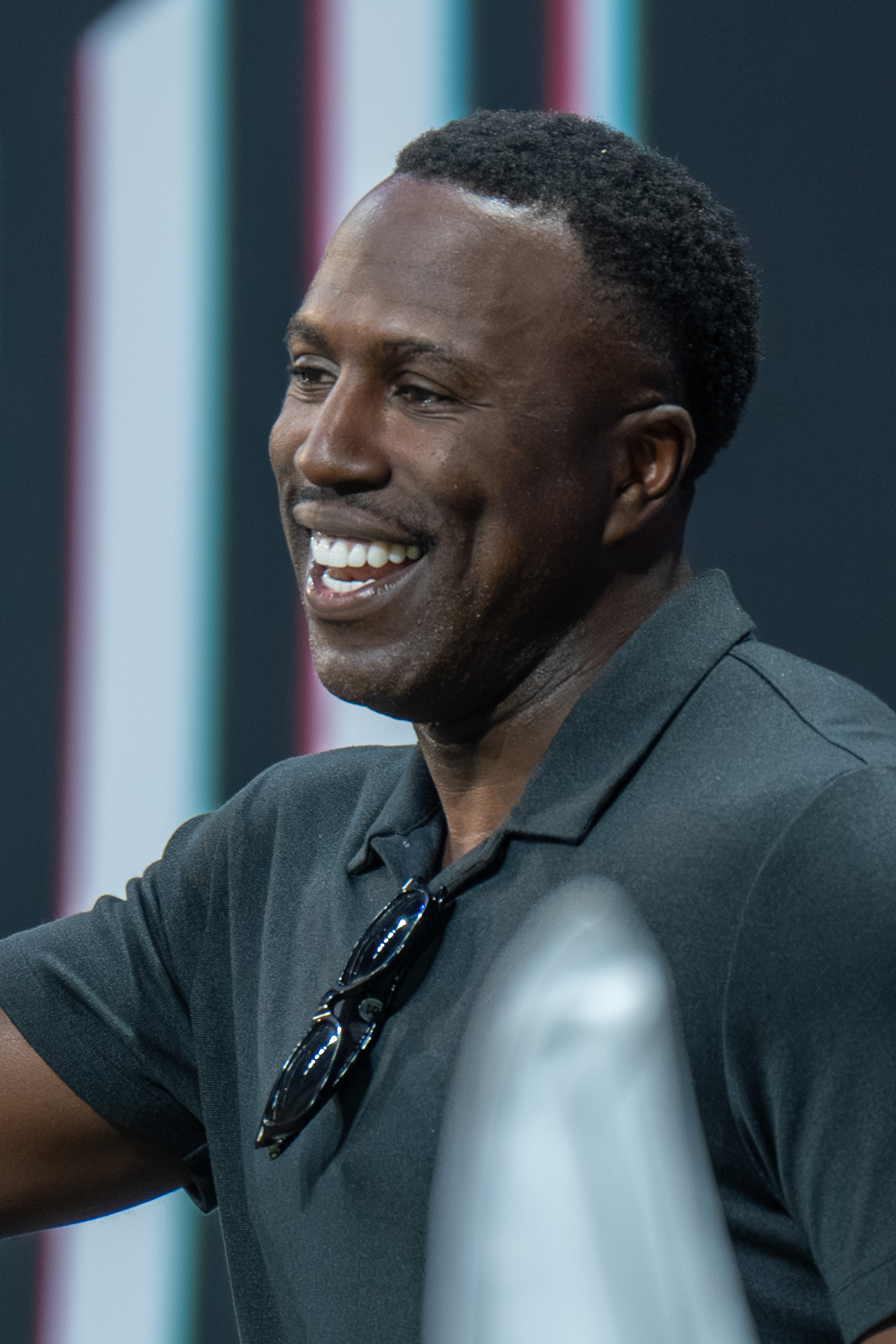
- Altidore in 2026

Personal information
- Full name: Josmer Volmy Altidore
- Date of birth: November 6, 1989 (age 37)
- Place of birth: Livingston, New Jersey, U.S.
- Height: 6 ft 1 in (1.85 m)
- Position: Striker

Youth career
- 2004–2006: IMG Soccer Academy

Senior career*
Years	Team	Apps	(Gls)
2006–2008	New York Red Bulls	37	(15)
2008–2011	Villarreal	9	(1)
2009	→ Xerez (loan)	0	(0)
2009–2010	→ Hull City (loan)	28	(1)
2011	→ Bursaspor (loan)	12	(1)
2011–2013	AZ	67	(39)
2013–2015	Sunderland	42	(1)
2015–2021	Toronto FC	139	(62)
2022–2023	New England Revolution	27	(2)
2022	→ Puebla (loan)	6	(2)
Total		367	(124)

International career
2005	United States U17	2	(0)
2007	United States U20	5	(4)
2008	United States U23	3	(1)
2007–2019	United States	115	(42)
Medal record
Men's soccer
Representing United States
FIFA Confederations Cup
Runner-up	2009 South Africa	Team
CONCACAF Gold Cup
Winner	2017 United States	Team
Runner-up	2011 United States	Team
Runner-up	2019 United States	Team
- * Club domestic league appearances and goals

Josmer Volmy "Jozy" Altidore (/ˈdʒoʊzi ˈæltɪdɔːr/ JOH-zee AL-ti-dor; born November 6, 1989) is an American former professional soccer player who played as a striker.

Altidore made his professional debut in 2006, at the age of 16, with the New York Red Bulls. In the middle of his third season with New York, in 2008, he transferred to top-tier Spanish side Villarreal for a fee of $10 million. During his time with Villarreal, he left on three loan stints – with Spanish Segunda División club Xerez in February–May 2009, English Premier League club Hull City for the entire 2009–10 season, and Turkish club Bursaspor where he went on a six-month loan. In the summer of 2011, he joined AZ in the Netherlands. On March 3, 2013, Altidore surpassed Clint Dempsey for most goals by an American in a European club season with his 24th goal of the 2012–13 campaign. During the 2013 summer transfer window, Sunderland signed Altidore. He spent one and a half seasons there, with a poor goal scoring record, then returned to MLS with Toronto FC.

Altidore had represented the United States at various levels of international competition, featuring for the United States U-17 team at the 2005 FIFA U-17 World Championship, U-20 team at the 2007 FIFA U-20 World Cup, and the U-23 team at the 2008 Beijing Olympics. He made his debut for the senior national team in 2007 and had since earned over 110 caps, representing them at the 2009 FIFA Confederations Cup, the 2011, 2015, 2017 and 2019 CONCACAF Gold Cups, and the 2010 and 2014 FIFA World Cups.

== Early life and education ==
Josmer Volmy Altidore was born on November 6, 1989, in Livingston, New Jersey. The youngest of four children to Haitian immigrants, Altidore was predominantly raised in Boca Raton, Florida. He enjoyed playing soccer from the time he was a boy. Altidore played for various South Florida youth teams such as Boca Raton Juniors Soccer Club, Schulz Academy and Sunrise S.C while also spending time training with the under-17 national team at the IMG Academy in Bradenton. He was raised a Jehovah's Witness. Jozy was selected as the 2006 Parade All American Boys Player of the Year.

== Club career ==
=== New York Red Bulls ===
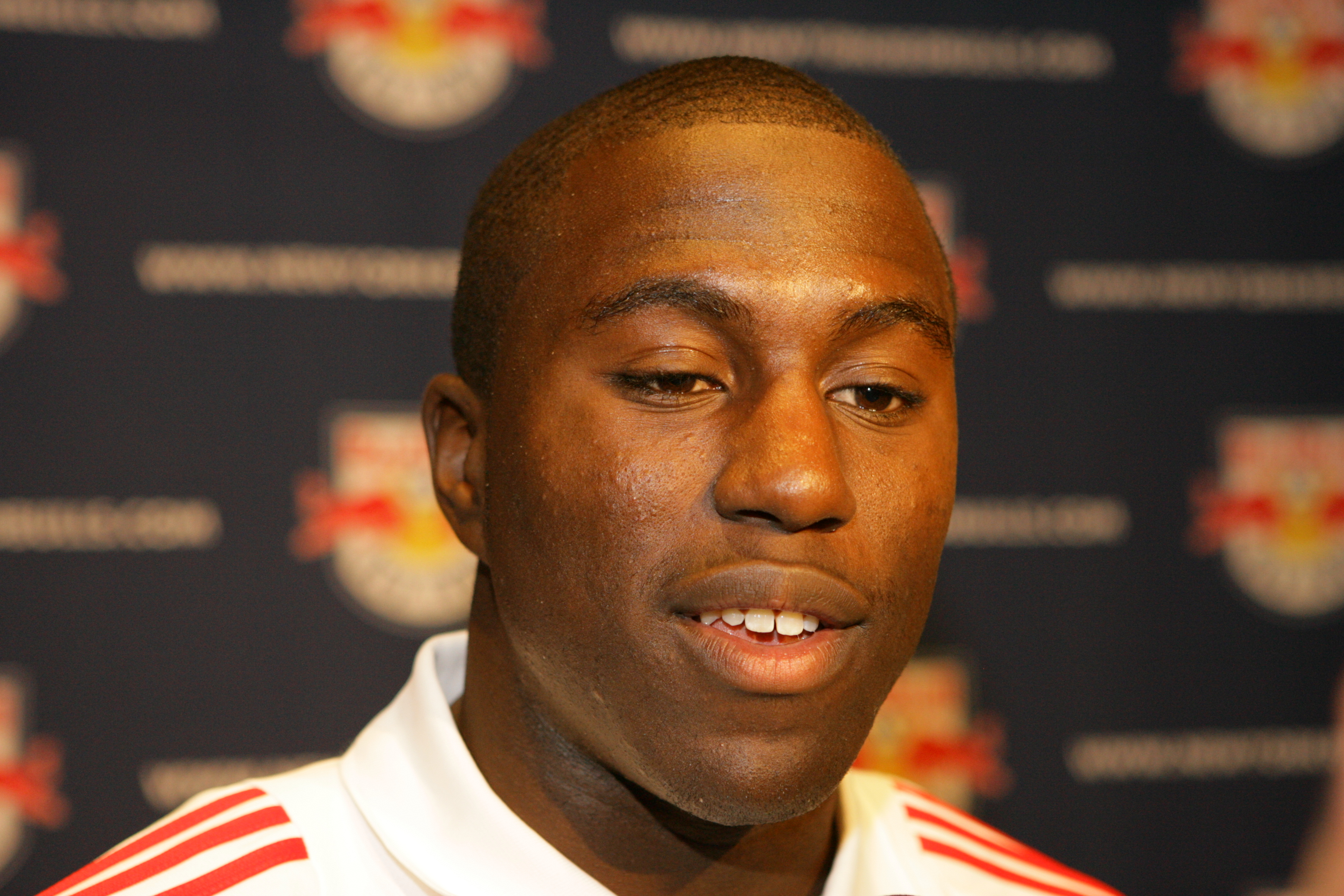
Altidore in a press conference with the Red Bulls in March 2008

Altidore was taken seventeenth overall in the 2006 MLS SuperDraft, with the MetroStars (now the New York Red Bulls) trading up to receive the selection. Altidore spent the majority of the 2006 season away from the team while working towards his high school diploma in Florida.

Altidore made his professional debut on August 23, 2006, as a substitute in a 3–1 U.S. Open Cup loss to D.C. United. He scored his first professional goal at the age of sixteen with an 83rd minute, 28-yard shot to beat the Columbus Crew 1–0 on September 16, 2006. Exactly one week later, on September 23, 2006, in a 4–3 loss to D.C. United, Altidore scored again. Scoring three times in seven appearances, including a crucial goal against Chicago Fire on September 30, 2006, Altidore became a fan favorite. He scored the Red Bulls' only goal of their 2–1 aggregate loss to D.C. United in the Eastern Conference Semifinals Series when he headed in a cross in the second leg. With that goal, he became the youngest player to score in the Major League Soccer playoffs at 16 years, 337 days (breaking DaMarcus Beasley's record by almost three years). Altidore was also the youngest to start in a Major League Soccer playoff match on October 21 against D.C. United (16 years, 349 days). He also scored two goals in a 5–4 win over Los Angeles Galaxy on August 18, 2007.

=== Spain ===
On June 4, 2008, Villarreal of La Liga agreed in principle with Major League Soccer and the New York Red Bulls to sign Altidore for roughly $10 million or €7.4 million. This transfer fee surpasses Fulham's fee for Clint Dempsey, which was $4 million or roughly £2 million, and was the largest fee paid for any MLS player at the time. Altidore finalized his personal contract and was unveiled by the club on June 11, 2008. On September 14, 2008, Altidore made his La Liga debut, coming on as a second-half substitute against Deportivo La Coruña. On November 1, 2008, he became the first American international to score in La Liga when he came on in the 90th minute and scored against Athletic Bilbao. On November 30, 2008, Altidore started his first game in La Liga against Recreativo Huelva. After spending a year and a half on loan, Altidore returned to Villarreal. He favored staying with Villarreal instead of another loan to try to prove to the club he was worth the investment they made two years ago.

On January 30, 2009, Villarreal agreed to loan Altidore to Xerez, leader of the Segunda División at the time of the transfer, until the end of the 2008–09 season. It was expected that the move would allow Altidore to get more playing time, and also allow him to continue the process of assimilating into the Spanish culture.

On April 16, 2009, Altidore underwent minor surgery on an injured toenail that required more than a month of recovery, resulting in him never making an appearance for Xerez.

=== Hull City and Bursaspor ===
On August 5, 2009, Altidore announced on his Twitter page that he would be loaned to English Premier League club Hull City. He joined Hull City the next day on a season-long loan with the option for Hull City to purchase his rights at the end of the 2009–10 season for a fee believed to be £6.5 million ($11 million).

On August 10, 2009, Hull City announced that they were successful in obtaining a work permit for Altidore. Altidore made his debut for Hull on August 22, 2009, coming on as a second-half substitute against Bolton. He provided the assist for Kamel Ghilas to score the only goal in a 1–0 home victory at the KC Stadium. On August 25, 2009, Altidore scored his first goal for Hull in a 3–1 win over Southend United in the second round of the League Cup. Altidore was popular with supporters but struggled to make a lasting impact with the Tigers as his finishing was often found wanting, however he did manage to score his first and only Premier League goal in the 2–1 home win over Manchester City on February 6. On April 24, in an important game for Hull City's Premier League survival, he was dismissed for violent conduct after a spat with Sunderland's Alan Hutton who was also sent off. Hull City lost 1–0 and were all but relegated from the top flight.

On January 31, 2011, Altidore was loaned out to Turkish champions Bursaspor on a six-month loan. On April 8, he scored his first goal for his new club in a 3–2 home loss to Antalyaspor.

=== AZ ===
On July 15, 2011, Altidore agreed to terms with Dutch side AZ.

2011–12

On August 7, Altidore made his debut for the club as a second-half substitute against PSV Eindhoven. Altidore scored in the 80th minute, helping his new side to a 3–1 opening day win. Altidore was again used as a sub in the club's next Eredivisie game as AZ fell 2–0 to FC Twente. Altidore made his first start in the league for AZ on August 21, when they played host to NEC Nijmegen at the AFAS Stadion. After a goalless first-half, Altidore opened the scoring in the 54th minute, pouncing on the rebound after NEC goalkeeper Jasper Cillessen saved his header. Altidore scored again nineteen minutes later after some nice passing with Adam Maher and AZ ran out 4–0 winners.

On August 25, Altidore started in the second leg of the UEFA Europa League final qualifying match against Aalesunds FK from Norway. Before being substituted in the 63rd minute by Charlison Benschop, Altidore scored twice. His first goal in the 23rd minute gave AZ a 2–0 lead and his second goal in the 59th minute brought the score to 4–0 in a game AZ eventually won by 6–0. Altidore added to his Europa League account when he opened the scoring in the 21st minute of his side's first group match against Malmö FF on September 15. After a long wait Altidore returned to the score sheet for AZ, netting in the 83rd minute of a 3–0 victory over ADO Den Haag on November 6 that also secured his side's 10th victory of the Eredivisie campaign. On December 4, Altidore scored his side's only goal in a 5–1 loss to Heerenveen. Altidore had to wait until February 8, 2012, to score his next league goal, grabbing a brace in a 6–0 win over ADO Den Haag. The result put AZ level on points with PSV at the top of the table.

Altidore headed in the winning goal against VVV Venlo on Sunday April 22 to keep AZ second in the table and their title hopes still alive.

Altidore led the team in scoring in his first campaign with 22 goals across all competitions. He finished tied for seventh in the Eredivisie in goals scored. Altidore credits his successful campaign to his new coach, manager Gertjan Verbeek.

2012–13

In the opening game of the new Eredivisie campaign, Altidore scored a quick brace as AZ drew 2–2 with reigning champions Ajax on August 12, 2012. Altidore continued his impressive start to the league campaign, netting another brace in the club's 3–1 victory over SC Heracles on the second weekend of the season. Following the international break, Altidore scored the first hat-trick of his club career on September 16, helping AZ to a 4–0 defeat of Roda JC.

Altidore powered his team to just their fourth victory in 17 games, and their first since October 28, netting a brace in a 2–1 defeat of PEC Zwolle on December 15. In the first game of 2013, Altidore hammered home 3 for the hat-trick against Vitesse Arnhem.

On April 14, Altidore netted his third hat-trick of the season in a 6–0 victory over FC Utrecht. On May 9, he scored the winning goal against PSV in the KNVB Cup final, helping AZ to lift the Dutch Cup for the first time in 31 years. Subsequently, Altidore became the first-ever American to be named in De Telegraaf's "Team of the Season" after finishing with 23 goals in the Eredivisie and 8 in the KNVB Cup.

=== Sunderland ===
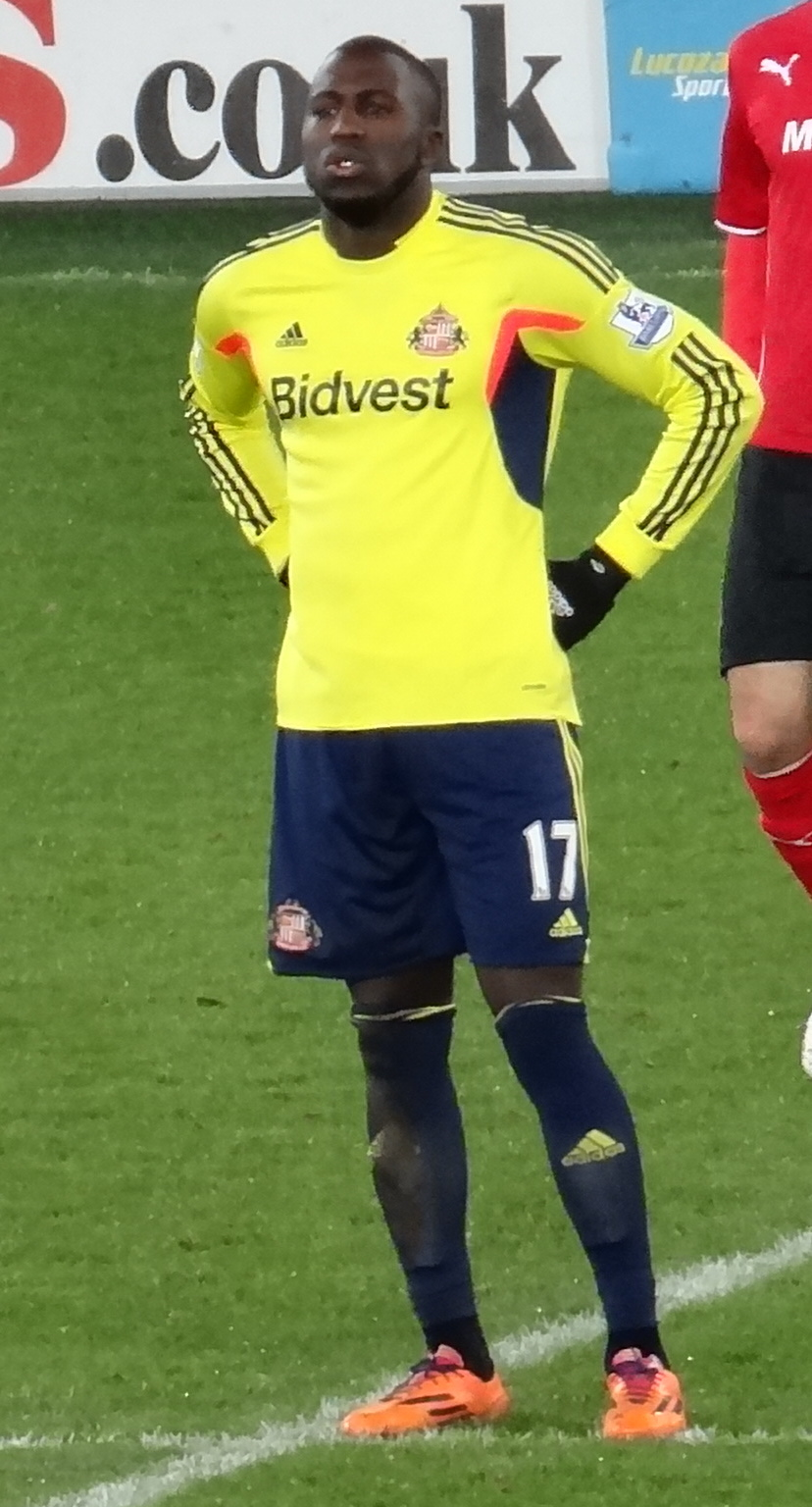
Altidore playing for Sunderland in 2013

On July 5, 2013, AZ agreed to sell Altidore's contract to English Premier League club Sunderland, with whom he signed a four-year contract. It was eventually reported that Sunderland paid AZ a $13 million transfer fee. Altidore's first goal for Sunderland came on August 27, 2013, spurring a dramatic late comeback in the League Cup, defeating MK Dons 4–2. In Altidore's first Tyne-Wear derby, he put in a man of the match performance in a 2–1 win. On December 4, 2013, Altidore scored his first league goal for Sunderland to give them a 1–0 lead against Chelsea, a game which eventually finished 3–4. After failing to find the net again for Sunderland, Altidore was dropped to the Sunderland Under 21s instead of playing against Tottenham Hotspur on April 7, 2014.

Altidore ended the 2013–14 season with two goals in 37 appearances, and by October 2014, he had made just six appearances and scored one goal. Altidore told reporters, "If it doesn't turn around then in January I'll be looking to start elsewhere" to stay in the United States national team picture.

Altidore left Sunderland in January 2015 for Toronto FC of Major League Soccer. He finished his stay with three goals in 52 appearances in all competitions and one goal in 42 league games.

=== Toronto FC ===
In January 2015, Toronto acquired Altidore and an undisclosed fee from Sunderland in exchange for striker Jermain Defoe. They signed him to a Designated Player contract. His former MLS side, the New York Red Bulls, were the league's preferred destination for Altidore, but Toronto was unwilling to accept the cash settlement required to complete the move. Altidore later said that his United States teammate Michael Bradley, who had joined the club the previous season, was an influence in his move to Canada. The two were seen on camera talking about the club during the 2014 FIFA World Cup.

==== 2015 season ====
On March 7, Altidore marked his competitive debut with a brace in a 3–1 victory at Vancouver Whitecaps FC and was named the MLS Week 1 Player of the Week. Although a four-match defeated run away from home followed, a further two goals from Altidore marked Toronto's second victory of the season in a 2–0 win at Orlando City SC. He added another on his home debut in a 2–1 defeat to the Houston Dynamo.

Altidore came close to his first piece of silverware with Toronto in May, scoring the opening goal in a 3–2 victory against the Montreal Impact in the second leg of the Canadian Championship semifinals. However, Toronto narrowly missed out on advancing to the final, losing the tie on away goals after having lost 1–0 in the first leg.

On July 25, Altidore converted an 89th-minute penalty to earn a point at Columbus Crew in a 3–3 draw. A week later, he was dismissed in the 39th minute of a defeat at the New England Revolution after kicking out at Jose Goncalves. Two late goals in the space of three minutes followed in a 5–0 victory against nine-men Orlando City SC, and another the following week against the 10-men Montreal Impact.

In the closing weeks of the season, he scored back-to-back goals at the BMO Field in wins against the Chicago Fire and the Philadelphia Union before picking up his second red card of the year a week later. Despite not starting in the 2–1 win against the New York Red Bulls, Altidore was dismissed as a substitute after directing foul and abusive language at a fourth official.

Helping Toronto advance to the 2015 MLS Cup playoffs, Altidore played 90 minutes but failed to register a shot as his side fell 3–0 at the Montreal Impact. He concluded his debut season with 14 goals in 27 appearances, and finished 10th in the overall MLS goalscoring charts. He finished second in his team only to Sebastian Giovinco, the 2015 MLS Golden Boot winner.

==== 2016 season ====
Altidore was unable to carry his form into the start of the 2016 season and failed to score in the fixture 20 MLS fixtures. After a missing a penalty in a 4–3 defeat to Vancouver Whitecaps FC in May, he finally broke his deadlock with an 87th-minute strike in a 3–0 win over Columbus Crew on July 31.

He added his second of the season a week later with a 93rd-minute goal to complete a 4–1 victory against the New England Revolution, and added his first away goal of the campaign in the following outing at the Houston Dynamo. Goals in victories at Philadelphia Union and Orlando City meant Altidore scored in four consecutive games for the first time in his career. He was named in the Week 24 and Week 27 MLS Team of the Week.

Altidore's form continued to pick up towards the latter stages of the season, and just one game after his scoring run he added another five goals in six games. His 68th and 86th-minute goals secured a point against the New York Red Bulls after being 3–1 down inside 48 minutes.

Altidore lifted his first trophy with Toronto after clinching the 2016 Canadian Championship, but couldn't register a goal during his club's cup campaign.

Sending Toronto to the 2016 MLS Cup playoffs, Altidore struck his side's third and final goal in a victory against the Philadelphia Union to progress to the Eastern Conference semifinals. With Toronto putting seven past New York City across two legs, he scored one in each game to reach the Eastern Conference final. Another seven goals were scored with a 7–5 aggregate victory against the Montreal Impact, and Altidore again added two to the tally.

Toronto reached the MLS Cup final for the first time in their history, but lost to Seattle Sounders FC on penalties after a goalless game. Altidore scored his team's first penalty, but a miss from Justin Morrow allowed the Sounders to lift the cup. With 15 goals in 29 games, he once again finished second in goals to Giovinco, but also in assists with nine throughout the season.

==== 2017 season ====
Ahead of the 2017 MLS season, the arrival of Spanish playmaker Victor Vázquez, and Coach Greg Vanney's switch in tactics from a 4–4–2 diamond to a 3–5–2 formation, benefitted Giovinco's and Altidore's attacking partnership, as it allowed them to play closer together; with Vázquez supporting them as the team's main creator, the attacking duo began to demonstrate a deeper understanding and an increased awareness of each other's movements, which improved their link-up play, and saw an increase in Altidore's goalscoring output throughout the season.

On March 4, Altidore scored from the penalty spot for his club's first goal of the season in their second league match – a 2–2 draw at the Philadelphia Union. He added his second of the campaign a week later in a 2–0 win at Vancouver Whitecaps FC. Three goals in April – including a brace against the Houston Dynamo – placed Toronto in good stead in the league standings, but Altidore only managed a single goal from the penalty spot the following month. He was named in the Week 9 MLS Team of the Week for his performance against Houston.

He added another in a 2–0 victory over D.C. United on June 17, and struck early in a 3–1 win at Orlando City SC. Altidore scored his third penalty of the season during a 4–0 win over New York City. After the third goal in a 3–0 win against the Philadelphia Union, Altidore scored in back-to-back-to-back fixtures – including a double in a 4–0 win against Vancouver Whitecaps FC.

With Toronto retaining their Canadian Championship, Altidore added a single goal to equalise in the first leg of the final. The game finished 1–1 at the Montreal Impact, before Toronto recorded a 2–1 win at home to lift the cup. Altidore also scored in the final two league fixtures, against the Montreal Impact and Atlanta United FC, as Toronto clinched the 2017 Supporter's Shield with a record-breaking 69 points. He was named in the Week 27 and Week 30 MLS Team of the Week, and as the Week 27 MLS Player of the Week.

Progressing to the MLS Cup playoffs for a third consecutive season, Altidore was involved in two controversial incidents against former club the New York Red Bulls in the Eastern Conference semifinal second leg. After a foul on Tyler Adams by teammate Giovinco in the first half, Altidore confronted Adams with an argument ensuing. He was subsequently shoved by New York's captain, Sacha Kljestan, and fell to the ground in an exaggerated manner; both players were cautioned by referee Chris Penso for their behaviour. During the half-time break, an altercation broke out between both teams in the tunnel, and while circumstances were unclear, Kljestan and Altidore were believed to be at the center of the incident. As a result, both players were sent off for violent conduct and Altidore went on to miss the conference final first leg with Toronto progressing on away goals. Toronto coach Vanney hinted that the club would file a protest with the league to overturn the suspension, but the appeal was later denied.

Returning for the Eastern Conference final second leg against the Columbus Crew, Altidore scored the decisive goal on the hour mark. Despite carrying an injury sustained earlier in the game, which eventually forced him off, he sent Toronto through to the MLS Cup Final – a repeat of the previous year's final with Seattle Sounders FC also progressing – with a 1–0 aggregate win.

On December 9, Altidore struck the opening goal of the MLS Cup final in the 67th minute; Toronto went on to win the match 2–0 at BMO Field and Altidore was named the MLS Cup MVP. He finished his season with 18 goals from 33 games, finishing behind Giovinco for a third consecutive season in the club's goalscoring charts. He finished 10th in the overall league goalscoring charts with 15 league goals, only one less than the highest scoring American C. J. Sapong.

==== 2018 season ====
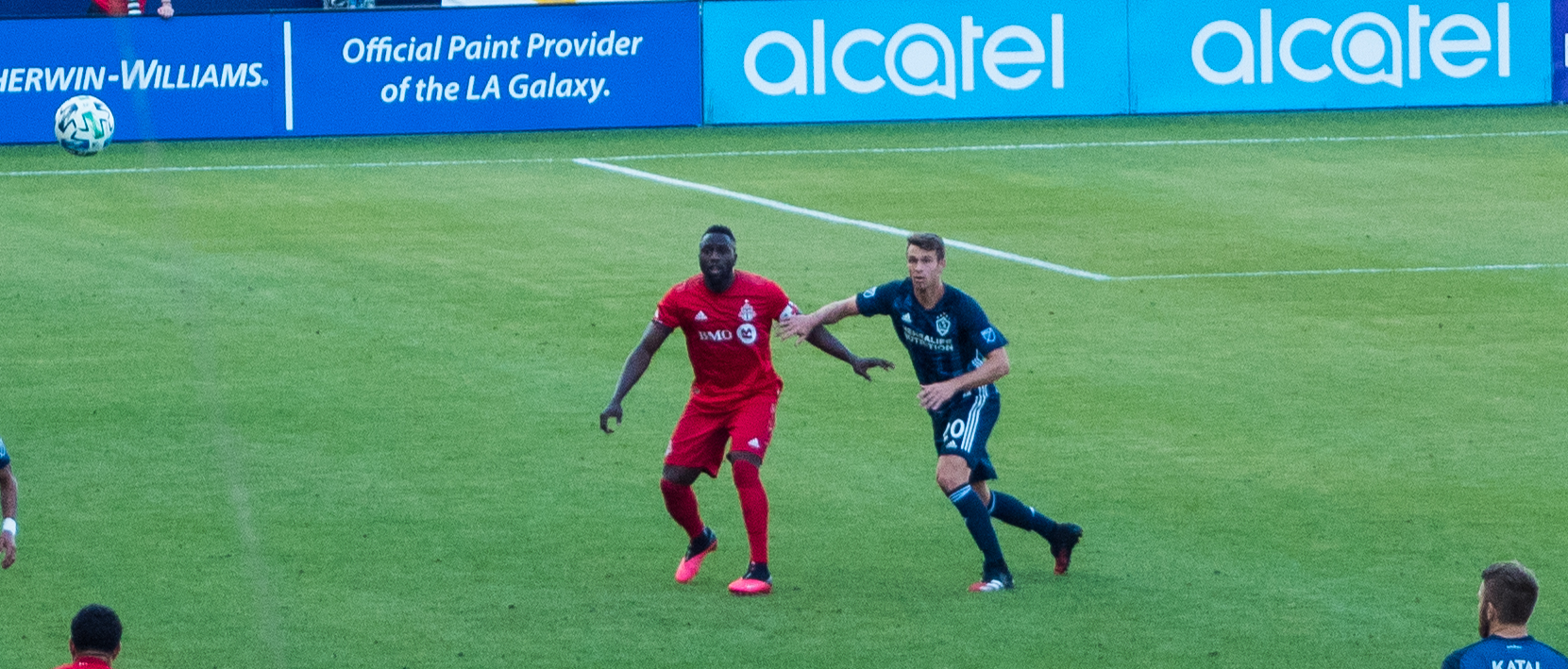
Altidore (in red) playing for Toronto FC against LA Galaxy in 2020

On March 7, 2018, in the first leg of the CONCACAF Champions League quarter-finals, Altidore scored in a 2–1 home win against Mexican side Tigres UANL. In the second leg, held on March 13, Altidore helped create an own goal in an eventual 3–2 away defeat; the result enabled Toronto to progress to the semi-finals of the competition for only the second time in their history, on away goals, following a 4–4 draw on aggregate. Altidore scored a brace on March 30, in a 3–1 home win against Real Salt Lake, which included his 50th goal for Toronto FC. On April 3, Altidore scored in a 3–1 home win over Club América in the first leg of the CONCACAF Champions League semi-final. He suffered an injury in the seventh minute of the second leg, on April 10, at the Estadio Azteca, and was replaced by Tosaint Ricketts; the match ended in a 1–1 away draw, which saw Toronto advance 4–2 on aggregate to the finals.

He made his 100th appearance for Toronto FC on April 25, in the second away leg of the 2018 CONCACAF Champions League Final against Chivas Guadalajara, although he was later forced off with an injury; Toronto won the match 2–1 to tie the score on aggregate, resulting in a penalty shoot-out, which Toronto lost 4–2. Altidore later underwent surgery to remove bone fragments from his foot, and it was announced that he would be sidelined for four to six weeks. He returned to action on July 21, in a 2–1 away win against Chicago Fire. On August 12, he was sent off after only 11 minutes in a 3–2 home defeat against New York City FC, after allegedly kicking defender Alexander Callens in the back of the leg. On August 15, in the second leg of the 2018 Canadian Championship Final, Altidore scored a hat-trick in a 5–2 home win over Vancouver Whitecaps to seal the title for Toronto with a 7–4 victory on aggregate.

==== 2019 season ====
On November 10, 2019, Altidore, having recently recovered from a quadriceps strain, came off the bench and scored an injury-time header in a 3–1 away defeat to Seattle Sounders in the 2019 MLS Cup Final.

==== 2020 season ====
On September 23, 2020, Altidore made his 150th appearance for Toronto FC in all competitions in a 1–0 away win against New York City FC.

=== New England Revolution ===
On February 14, 2022, Altidore was acquired by New England Revolution via free agency after Toronto exercised their option to buyout Altidore's contract. He made his Revolution debut in the 2022 season opener on February 26, playing 11 minutes in a 2-2 draw against the Portland Timbers. He scored his first goal for the Revolution on March 12 in a 3-2 loss to Real Salt Lake. On June 15, 2023, After scoring two goals across twenty-seven league appearances, the New England Revolution bought out Altidore's contract, and he subsequently departed the club. He would retire from professional football after his contract expired.

==== Puebla (loan) ====
On July 28, 2022, Altidore was acquired by Liga MX side Puebla on a six-month loan.

== International career ==
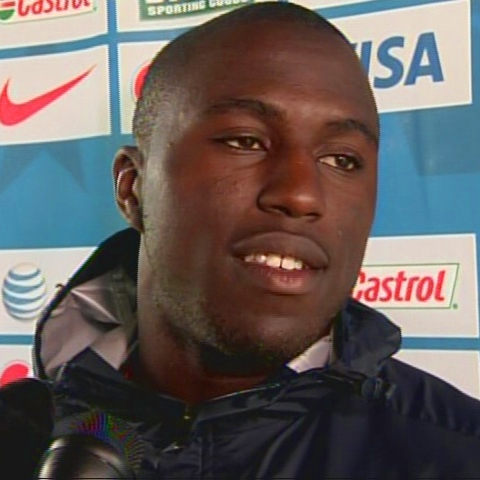
Altidore during a press conference in Johannesburg, South Africa during the 2010 FIFA World Cup

In the 2007 FIFA U-20 World Cup held in Canada, Altidore finished tied third in overall scoring with four goals. He scored three in the first round, one vs. Poland in Montreal and two vs. Brazil in Ottawa, and added a fourth goal vs. Austria in the quarterfinals in Toronto.

Altidore made his full international debut on November 17, 2007, in a friendly game away to South Africa. On February 7, 2008, he scored his first international goal by heading home a cross from Drew Moor in a friendly match against Mexico in Houston, Texas.

On March 28, 2009, Altidore scored his first away goal in World Cup Qualifying in the 2–2 draw with El Salvador. On April 1, 2009, Altidore scored three goals in a 3–0 victory over Trinidad and Tobago, making Altidore the youngest American to score a hat-trick in an international game.

On June 24, 2009, Altidore scored in the semi-final of the 2009 FIFA Confederations Cup against Spain, turning club teammate Joan Capdevilla to get a clear shot on Iker Casillas' goal. The U.S. went on to defeat the Spanish team, 2–0.

Altidore started at striker in all four of the United States' games in the 2010 FIFA World Cup, garnering only one assist with no goals scored.

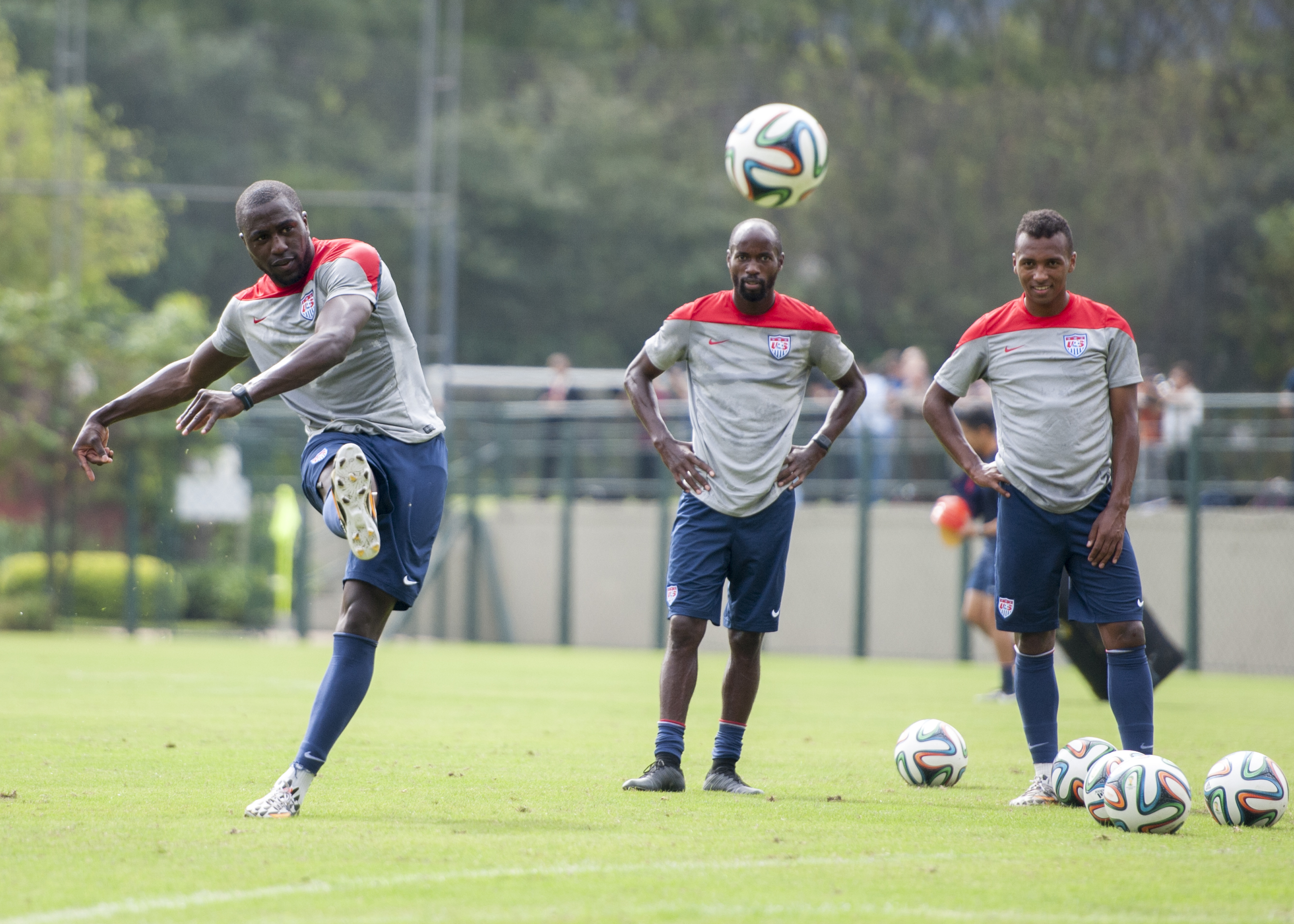
Altidore (left) practices with DaMarcus Beasley (centre) and Julian Green (right) during the 2014 FIFA World Cup in Brazil

Altidore suffered a hamstring injury at the 2011 CONCACAF Gold Cup.

On June 2, 2013, Altidore ended an almost two-year scoring drought by sinking the first goal in an international friendly against Germany. He subsequently scored in his next two international games against Jamaica and Panama, marking the first time that he has scored in three consecutive international games. Altidore then went on to score in a fourth consecutive game against Honduras in a World Cup Qualification match on June 18. Scoring in four consecutive matches tied Altidore all-time for most consecutive games with a goal by any USMNT player, joining a select group of players that includes Landon Donovan, Eddie Johnson, Eric Wynalda, and William Lubbe.

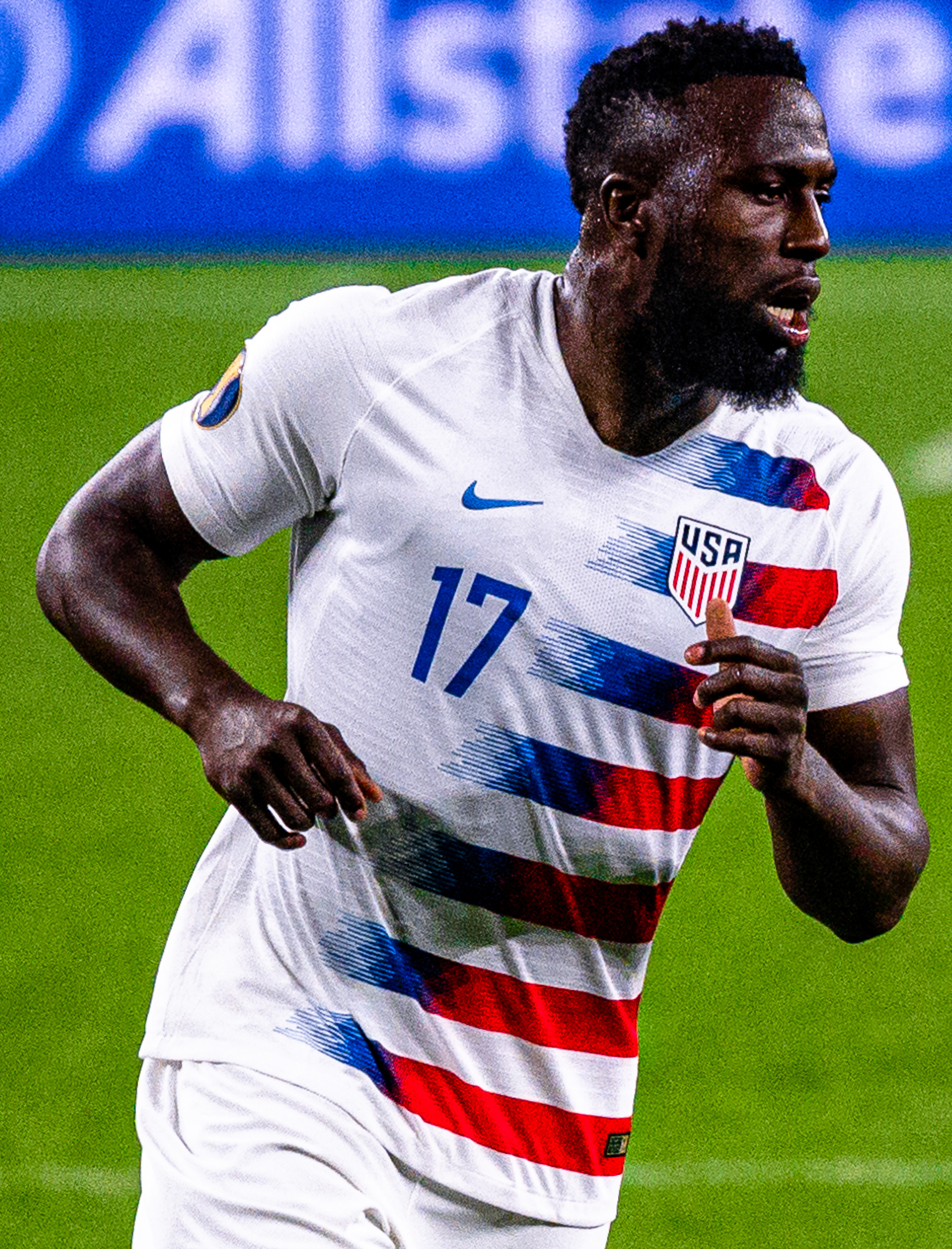
Altidore with the United States in 2019

On August 14, 2013, Altidore scored a hat-trick in the United States' 4–3 comeback win over Bosnia and Herzegovina, notably scoring from a free kick just outside the box with a curling effort. Altidore's three goals and an assist stretched his consecutive game scoring streak to 5 games, the most in U.S. national team history. On June 7, 2014, Altidore broke his goal-scoring drought with two goals against Nigeria, the defending Africa Cup of Nations champions.

On June 16, 2014, in the United States' opening 2014 FIFA World Cup match against Ghana, Altidore injured a hamstring and had to be carried from the field.

On March 31, 2015, Altidore received his first international red card for verbally abusing FIFA referee Luca Banti in an eventual 1–1 friendly draw against Switzerland in Zürich.

Altidore became the 17th American to reach 100 international caps on January 29, 2017, when he started in a goalless draw against Serbia. Only Donovan had reached the milestone at a younger age than his 27 years.

== Style of play ==
Having been a quick and physically powerful striker, Altidore was both capable of scoring goals and linking up with his teammates, due to his movement, finishing, and work-rate. His height, strength, and ability in the air also enabled him to hold up the ball with his back to goal and act as a target forward; he had also been capable of being deployed on the wing, or as a second striker.

== Personal life ==
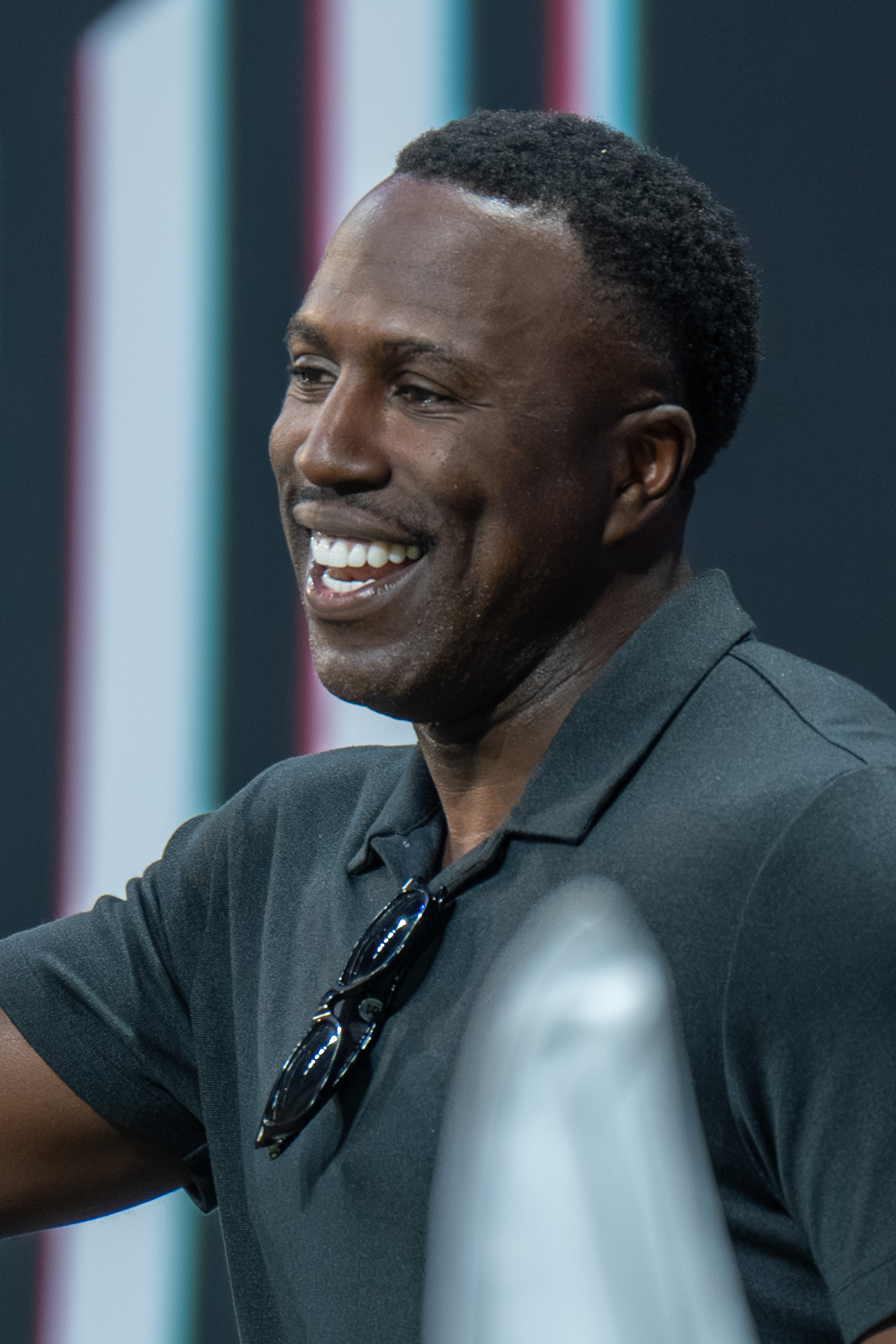
Altidore in 2026

In 2007, Altidore was a candidate for ESPN's Next Award and is one of the stars featured in Adidas' "Impossible is Nothing" advertisements. Altidore is featured on the cover of the North American version of FIFA 08 by EA Sports, alongside Ronaldinho and Guillermo Ochoa.

Following the 2010 Haiti earthquake, Altidore joined the relief effort by asking people to donate to Yéle Haiti. He appeared on CNN to discuss his family members still living in Haiti and to encourage people to give money.

In honor of the 26 victims of the Sandy Hook Elementary School shooting a week earlier, Altidore wrote their names on the boots he wore in the game against FC Twente on December 21, 2012.

In April 2019, he proposed to his girlfriend, American tennis player and Grand Slam champion, Sloane Stephens. They wed on January 1, 2022. Stephens announced their divorce via social media message on February 21, 2026.

Altidore has a son from a previous relationship.

Altidore is part of a consortium that included Tracy McGrady, Vince Carter and a coalition of private equity funds and executives who purchased a 20% stake in the Buffalo Bills of the National Football League in December 2024. A longtime American football fan, Altidore described the joining of the Bills ownership as a "dream come true."

Altidore is also an investor in USL Championship soccer club OKC Energy.

== Career statistics ==
=== Club ===
Appearances and goals by club, season and competition
Club	Season	League			National cup		League cup		Continental		Other		Total	
Club	Season	Division	Apps	Goals	Apps	Goals	Apps	Goals	Apps	Goals	Apps	Goals	Apps	Goals
New York Red Bulls	2006	MLS	7	3	0	0	—		—		2 (Note: Appearance(s) in MLS Cup playoffs)	1	9	4
New York Red Bulls	2007	MLS	22	9	0	0	—		—		2	0	24	9
New York Red Bulls	2008	MLS	8	3	0	0	—		—		—		8	3
New York Red Bulls	Total		37	15	0	0	—		—		4	1	41	16
Villarreal	2008–09	La Liga	6	1	2	0	—		—		—		8	1
Villarreal	2009–10	La Liga	0	0	0	0	—		—		—		0	0
Villarreal	2010–11	La Liga	3	0	4	2	—		7 (Note: Appearances in UEFA Europa League)	0	—		14	2
Villarreal	Total		9	1	6	2	—		7	0	—		22	3
Xerez (loan)	2008–09	Segunda División	0	0	0	0	—		—		—		0	0
Hull City (loan)	2009–10	Premier League	28	1	1	0	1	1	—		—		30	2
Bursaspor (loan)	2010–11	Süper Lig	12	1	0	0	—		—		—		12	1
AZ	2011–12	Eredivisie	34	16	4	0	—		14	4	—		52	20
AZ	2012–13	Eredivisie	33	23	6	8	—		2	0	—		41	31
AZ	Total		67	39	10	8	—		16	4	—		93	51
Sunderland	2013–14	Premier League	31	1	2	0	6	1	—		—		39	2
Sunderland	2014–15	Premier League	11	0	0	0	2	1	—		—		13	1
Sunderland	Total		42	1	2	0	8	2	—		—		52	3
Toronto FC	2015	MLS	25	13	1	1	—		—		1	0	27	14
Toronto FC	2016	MLS	23	10	0	0	—		—		6	5	29	15
Toronto FC	2017	MLS	27	15	2	1	—		—		4	2	33	18
Toronto FC	2018	MLS	13	7	3	3	—		8 (Note: Appearances in CONCACAF Champions League)	3	1 (Note: Appearance in Campeones Cup)	0	25	13
Toronto FC	2019	MLS	22	11	2	0	—		0	0	1	1	25	12
Toronto FC	2020	MLS	13 (Note: Includes one appearance in MLS is Back Tournament group stage)	2	0	0	—		—		2 (Note: One appearance in MLS is Back Tournament knockout stage, one appearance in MLS Cup playoffs)	0	15	2
Toronto FC	2021	MLS	16	4	1	1	—		2	0	—		19	5
Toronto FC	Total		139	62	9	6	—		10	3	15	8	173	79
New England Revolution	2022	MLS	17	1	—		—		2	0	—		19	1
New England Revolution	2023	MLS	10	1	1	0	—		—		0	0	11	1
New England Revolution	Total		27	2	1	0	—		2	0	0	0	30	2
Puebla (loan)	2022–23	Liga MX	6	2	—		—		—		—		6	2
Career total			367	124	29	16	9	3	35	7	19	9	459	159

=== International ===
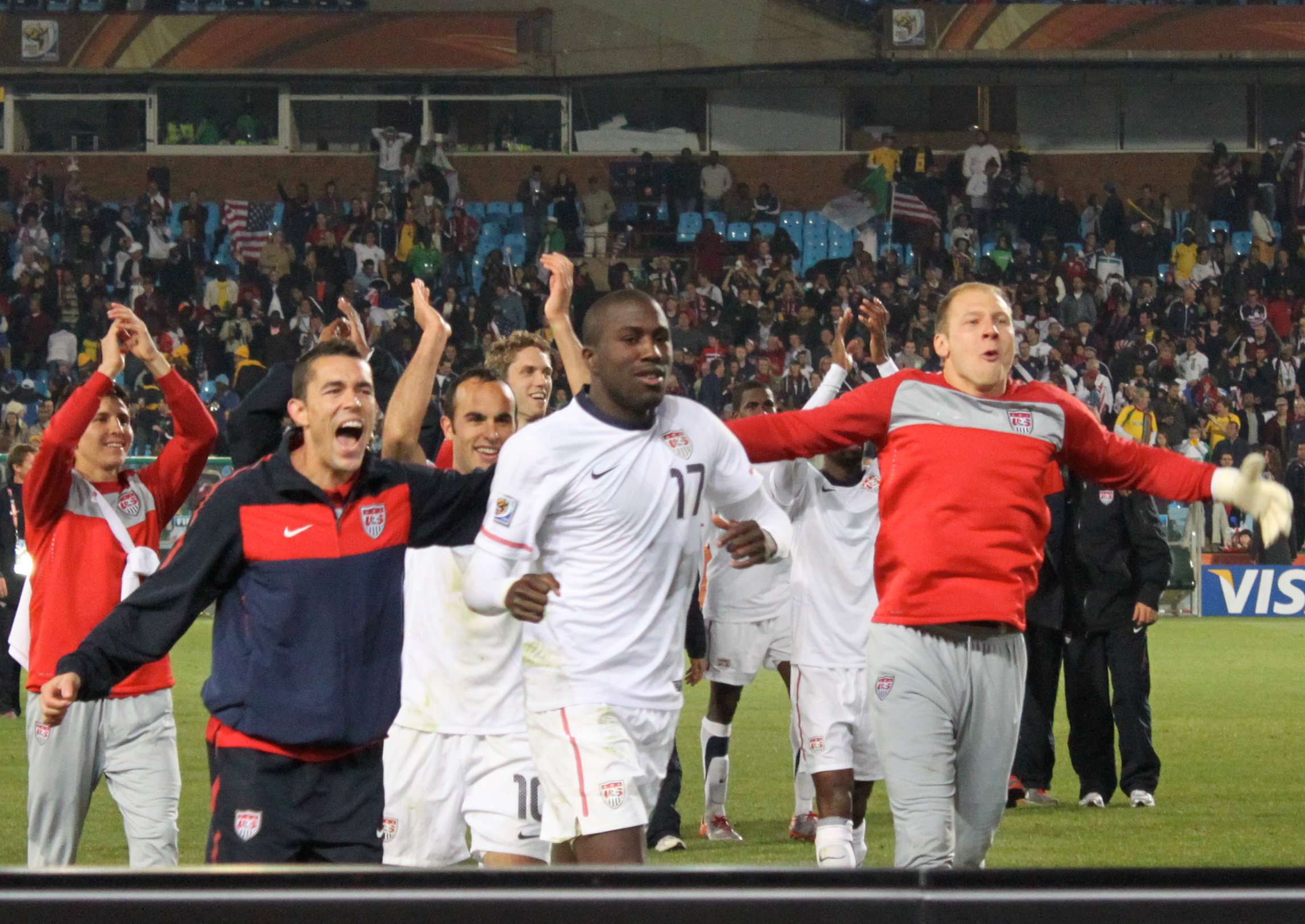
Altidore (number 17) celebrates the United States' victory against Algeria at the 2010 FIFA World Cup

Appearances and goals by national team and year
National team	Year	Apps	Goals
United States	2007	1	0
United States	2008	5	2
United States	2009	17	6
United States	2010	9	2
United States	2011	13	3
United States	2012	7	0
United States	2013	14	8
United States	2014	10	4
United States	2015	13	6
United States	2016	10	6
United States	2017	11	4
United States	2018	0	0
United States	2019	5	1
Total		115	42

Scores and results list United States' goal tally first, score column indicates score after each Altidore goal.

List of international goals scored by Jozy Altidore
No.	Date	Cap	Venue	Opponent	Score	Result	Competition	Ref.
1	6 February 2008	3	Reliant Stadium, Houston, United States	Mexico	2–1	2–2	Friendly	
2	11 October 2008	4	RFK Stadium, Washington, D.C., United States	Cuba	5–1	6–1	2010 FIFA World Cup qualification	
3	28 March 2009	8	Estadio Cuscatlán, San Salvador, El Salvador	El Salvador	1–2	2–2	2010 FIFA World Cup qualification	
4	1 April 2009	9	LP Field, Nashville, United States	Trinidad and Tobago	1–0	3–0	2010 FIFA World Cup qualification	
5	1 April 2009	9	LP Field, Nashville, United States	Trinidad and Tobago	2–0	3–0	2010 FIFA World Cup qualification	
6	1 April 2009	9	LP Field, Nashville, United States	Trinidad and Tobago	3–0	3–0	2010 FIFA World Cup qualification	
7	24 June 2009	15	Free State Stadium, Bloemfontein, South Africa	Spain	1–0	2–0	2009 FIFA Confederations Cup	
8	5 September 2009	18	Rio Tinto Stadium, Sandy, United States	El Salvador	2–1	2–1	2010 FIFA World Cup qualification	
9	29 May 2010	25	Lincoln Financial Field, Philadelphia, United States	Turkey	1–1	2–1	Friendly	
10	9 October 2010	31	Soldier Field, Chicago, United States	Poland	1–0	2–2	Friendly	
11	7 June 2011	36	Ford Field, Detroit, United States	Canada	1–0	2–0	2011 CONCACAF Gold Cup	
12	14 June 2011	38	Livestrong Sporting Park, Kansas City, United States	Guadeloupe	1–0	1–0	2011 CONCACAF Gold Cup	
13	15 November 2011	45	Stožice Stadium, Ljubljana, Slovenia	Slovenia	3–1	3–2	Friendly	
14	2 June 2013	57	RFK Stadium, Washington, D.C., United States	Germany	1–0	4–3	Friendly	
15	7 June 2013	58	Independence Park, Kingston, Jamaica	Jamaica	1–0	2–1	2014 FIFA World Cup qualification	
16	11 June 2013	59	CenturyLink Field, Seattle, United States	Panama	1–0	2–0	2014 FIFA World Cup qualification	
17	18 June 2013	60	Rio Tinto Stadium, Sandy, United States	Honduras	1–0	1–0	2014 FIFA World Cup qualification	
18	14 August 2013	61	Koševo City Stadium, Sarajevo, Bosnia and Herzegovina	Bosnia and Herzegovina	2–2	4–3	Friendly	
19	14 August 2013	61	Koševo City Stadium, Sarajevo, Bosnia and Herzegovina	Bosnia and Herzegovina	3–2	4–3	Friendly	
20	14 August 2013	61	Koševo City Stadium, Sarajevo, Bosnia and Herzegovina	Bosnia and Herzegovina	4–2	4–3	Friendly	
21	11 October 2013	63	Livestrong Sporting Park, Kansas City, United States	Jamaica	2–0	2–0	2014 FIFA World Cup qualification	
22	7 June 2014	70	EverBank Field, Jacksonville, United States	Nigeria	1–0	2–1	Friendly	
23	7 June 2014	70	EverBank Field, Jacksonville, United States	Nigeria	2–0	2–1	Friendly	
24	14 October 2014	74	FAU Stadium, Boca Raton, United States	Honduras	1–0	1–1	Friendly	
25	14 November 2014	75	Craven Cottage, London, England	Colombia	–	1–2	Friendly	
26	29 January 2015	77	Estadio El Teniente, Rancagua, Chile	Chile	2–1	2–3	Friendly	
27	25 March 2015	79	Aarhus Stadium, Aarhus, Denmark	Denmark	1–0	2–3	Friendly	
28	4 September 2015	84	RFK Stadium, Washington, D.C., United States	Peru	1–1	2–1	Friendly	
29	4 September 2015	84	RFK Stadium, Washington, D.C., United States	Peru	2–1	2–1	Friendly	
30	13 November 2015	88	Busch Stadium, St. Louis, United States	Saint Vincent and the Grenadines	3–1	6–1	2018 FIFA World Cup qualification	
31	13 November 2015	88	Busch Stadium, St. Louis, United States	Saint Vincent and the Grenadines	6–1	6–1	2018 FIFA World Cup qualification	
32	31 January 2016	90	StubHub Center, Carson, United States	Iceland	1–1	3–2	Friendly	
33	5 February 2016	91	StubHub Center, Carson, United States	Canada	1–0	1–0	Friendly	
34	29 March 2016	93	Mapfre Stadium, Columbus, United States	Guatemala	4–0	4–0	2018 FIFA World Cup qualification	
35	2 September 2016	94	Arnos Vale Stadium, Arnos Vale, Saint Vincent and the Grenadines	Saint Vincent and the Grenadines	3–0	6–0	2018 FIFA World Cup qualification	
36	6 September 2016	95	EverBank Field, Jacksonville, United States	Trinidad and Tobago	2–0	4–0	2018 FIFA World Cup qualification	
37	6 September 2016	95	EverBank Field, Jacksonville, United States	Trinidad and Tobago	3–0	4–0	2018 FIFA World Cup qualification	
38	22 July 2017	106	AT&T Stadium, Arlington, United States	Costa Rica	1–0	2–0	2017 CONCACAF Gold Cup	
39	26 July 2017	107	Levi's Stadium, Santa Clara, United States	Jamaica	1–0	2–1	2017 CONCACAF Gold Cup	
40	6 October 2017	109	Orlando City Stadium, Orlando, United States	Panama	2–0	4–0	2018 FIFA World Cup qualification	
41	6 October 2017	109	Orlando City Stadium, Orlando, United States	Panama	3–0	4–0	2018 FIFA World Cup qualification	
42	26 June 2019	113	Children's Mercy Park, Kansas City, United States	Panama	1–0	1–0	2019 CONCACAF Gold Cup	

== Honors ==
AZ

- KNVB Cup: 2012–13

Sunderland

- Football League Cup runner-up: 2013–14

Toronto FC

- MLS Cup: 2017; runner-up: 2016, 2019
- Supporters' Shield: 2017
- Canadian Championship: 2016, 2017, 2018; runner-up: 2019
- CONCACAF Champions League runner-up: 2018

United States

- FIFA Confederations Cup runner-up: 2009
- CONCACAF Gold Cup: 2017; runner-up: 2011, 2019

Individual

- U.S. Soccer Young Male Athlete of the Year: 2006
- U.S. Soccer Athlete of the Year: 2013, 2016
- MLS All-Star: 2015, 2017
- MLS Cup MVP Award: 2017
- CONCACAF Gold Cup Best XI: 2017

== See also ==
- List of men's footballers with 100 or more international caps
