= 2019 Toronto FC season =

Toronto FC 2019 soccer season

Toronto FC
2019 season
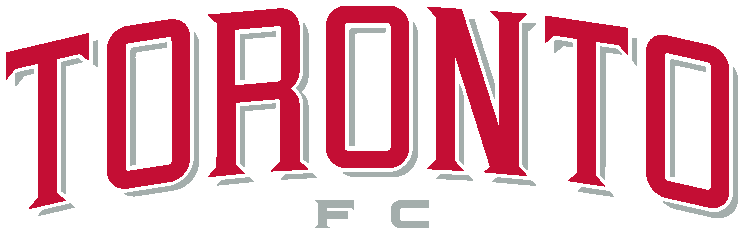
- General manager: Ali Curtis
- Head coach: Greg Vanney
- Stadium: BMO Field
- Major League Soccer: Conference: 4th Overall: 9th
- MLS Cup playoffs: Runners-up
- Canadian Championship: Runners-up
- CONCACAF Champions League: Round of 16
- Top goalscorer: League: Alejandro Pozuelo (12); All: Alejandro Pozuelo (14)
- Highest home attendance: League: 28,989 (August 24 vs. Montreal Impact)
- Lowest home attendance: League: 22,651 (April 19 vs. Minnesota United FC); All: 12,683 (August 14 vs. Ottawa Fury FC, Canadian Championship)
- Average home league attendance: League: 25,048
- Biggest win: 4–0 (March 29 vs. New York City FC); 5–1 (September 7 at FC Cincinnati; October 19 vs. D.C. United, playoffs)
- Biggest defeat: 0–4 (February 19 at Independiente, Champions League)
Home colours	Away colours

The 2019 Toronto FC season was the 13th season in the history of Toronto FC.

== Season ==
=== Pre-season ===
Gregory van der Wiel was sent home from the club's pre-season camp in California after "an altercation with manager Greg Vanney".

== Squad ==
As of August 1, 2019.

No.	Player	Nationality	Position(s)	Date of birth (age)	Signed in	Previous club
Goalkeepers
16	Quentin Westberg	(United States) (France)	GK	April 25, 1986 (aged 33)	2019	(France) Auxerre
25	Alex Bono	(United States)	GK	April 25, 1994 (aged 25)	2015	(United States) Syracuse Orange
28	Caleb Patterson-Sewell	(United States)	GK	May 20, 1987 (aged 32)	2018	(United States) Jacksonville Armada
Defenders
2	Justin Morrow	(United States)	LB / LWB / CB	October 4, 1987 (aged 32)	2014	(United States) San Jose Earthquakes
3	Drew Moor	(United States)	CB	January 15, 1984 (aged 35)	2016	(United States) Colorado Rapids
5	Ashtone Morgan	(Canada)	LB / LWB	February 9, 1991 (aged 28)	2011	(Canada) Toronto FC Academy
15	Eriq Zavaleta	(United States)	CB	August 2, 1992 (aged 27)	2015	(United States) Seattle Sounders FC
22	Richie Laryea	(Canada)	RB	January 7, 1995 (aged 24)	2019	(United States) Orlando City SC
23	Chris Mavinga	(Democratic Republic of the Congo) (France)	CB / LB	May 26, 1991 (aged 28)	2017	(Russia) Rubin Kazan
26	Laurent Ciman	(Belgium)	CB	August 5, 1985 (aged 34)	2018	(France) Dijon
44	Omar Gonzalez	(United States)	CB	October 11, 1988 (aged 31)	2019	(Mexico) Pachuca
52	Julian Dunn	(Canada)	CB	July 11, 2000 (aged 19)	2018	(Canada) Toronto FC II
96	Auro Jr.	(Brazil)	RB / RWB	January 23, 1996 (aged 23)	2018	(Brazil) São Paulo
Midfielders
4	Michael Bradley	(United States)	DM / CM	July 31, 1987 (aged 32)	2014	(Italy) Roma
7	Nicolas Benezet	(France)	MF	February 24, 1991 (aged 28)	2019	(France) Guingamp (loan)
8	Marky Delgado	(United States)	CM	May 16, 1995 (aged 24)	2015	(United States) Chivas USA
10	Alejandro Pozuelo	(Spain)	AM	September 20, 1991 (aged 28)	2019	(Belgium) Genk
14	Jay Chapman	(Canada)	AM	January 1, 1994 (aged 25)	2015	(United States) Michigan State Spartans
18	Nick DeLeon	(United States)	RB / RM	July 17, 1990 (aged 29)	2018	(United States) D.C. United
21	Jonathan Osorio	(Canada)	AM / CM	June 12, 1992 (aged 27)	2013	(Canada) SC Toronto
27	Liam Fraser	(Canada)	DM	February 13, 1998 (aged 21)	2018	(Canada) Toronto FC II
31	Tsubasa Endoh	(Japan)	MF	August 20, 1993 (aged 26)	2019	(Canada) Toronto FC II
59	Noble Okello	(Canada)	MF	July 20, 2000 (aged 19)	2019	(Canada) Toronto FC II
Forwards
9	Erickson Gallardo	(Venezuela)	RW	July 26, 1996 (aged 23)	2019	(Venezuela) Zamora
13	Patrick Mullins	(United States)	FW	February 5, 1992 (aged 27)	2019	(United States) Columbus Crew
17	Jozy Altidore	(United States)	CF	November 6, 1989 (aged 30)	2015	(England) Sunderland
19	Griffin Dorsey	(United States)	FW	March 5, 1999 (aged 20)	2019	(United States) Indiana Hoosiers
20	Ayo Akinola	(United States) (Canada)	ST	January 20, 2000 (aged 19)	2018	(Canada) Toronto FC II
24	Jacob Shaffelburg	(Canada)	FW	November 26, 1999 (aged 20)	2019	(Canada) Toronto FC II

=== International roster slots ===
Toronto had seven MLS International Roster Slots for use in the 2019 season. They traded one International Spot to Columbus until the end of 2019.

Toronto FC International slots
Slot	Player	Nationality
1	Auro Jr.	Brazil
2	Laurent Ciman	Belgium
3	Tsubasa Endoh	Japan
4	Erickson Gallardo	Venezuela
5	Chris Mavinga	DR Congo
6	Alejandro Pozuelo	Spain
7	Nicolas Benezet	France
8	Traded to Columbus Crew	

|}

== Transfers ==
=== In ===
==== Transferred in ====
No.	Pos.	Player	Transferred from	Fee/notes	Date	Source
18	DF	(United States) Nick DeLeon	(United States) D.C. United	Selected in 2018 MLS Re-Entry Draft	December 14, 2018	
96	DF	(Brazil) Auro Jr.	(Brazil) São Paulo	Purchase option exercised	December 17, 2018	
26	DF	(Belgium) Laurent Ciman	(France) Dijon	Acquired via MLS allocation order	December 27, 2018	
19	FW	(United States) Griffin Dorsey	(United States) Indiana Hoosiers	Selected in 2019 MLS SuperDraft	January 11, 2019	
31	MF	(Japan) Tsubasa Endoh	(Canada) Toronto FC II	Promoted to first team	January 16, 2019	
59	MF	(Canada) Noble Okello	(Canada) Toronto FC II	Promoted to first team	January 22, 2019	
91	FW	(United States) Terrence Boyd	(Germany) Darmstadt 98	Undisclosed	February 5, 2019	
16	GK	(United States) Quentin Westberg	(France) Auxerre	Undisclosed	February 25, 2019	
10	MF	(Spain) Alejandro Pozuelo	(Belgium) Genk	Undisclosed	March 4, 2019	
22	MF	(Canada) Richie Laryea	(United States) Orlando City SC	Free transfer	March 21, 2019	
24	FW	(Canada) Jacob Shaffelburg	(Canada) Toronto FC II	Homegrown player	June 21, 2019	
44	DF	(United States) Omar Gonzalez	(Mexico) Pachuca	Acquired via MLS allocation order	July 9, 2019	
9	MF	(Venezuela) Erickson Gallardo	(Venezuela) Zamora	Targeted allocation money (TAM)	July 9, 2019	
13	FW	(United States) Patrick Mullins	(United States) Columbus Crew	Acquired in trade for Jordan Hamilton	July 10, 2019	

==== Loaned in ====
No.	Pos.	Player	Loaned from	Fee/notes	Date	Source
7	MF	(France) Nicolas Benezet	(France) Guingamp	Targeted allocation money (TAM), Option to buy	July 30, 2019	

==== Draft picks ====
Draft picks are not automatically signed to the team roster. Only those who are signed to a contract will be listed as transfers in.

No.	Pos.	Player	Previous club	Notes	Date	Source
19	FW	(United States) Griffin Dorsey	(United States) Indiana Hoosiers	MLS SuperDraft first-round pick (#6); Generation Adidas player	January 11, 2019	
	MF	(Scotland) Adam Wilson	(United States) Louisville Cardinals	MLS SuperDraft second-round pick (#39)	January 11, 2019	
	CB	(Denmark) Patrick Bunk-Andersen	(United States) Clemson Tigers	MLS SuperDraft third-round pick (#54)	January 14, 2019	

=== Out ===
==== Transferred out ====
No.	Pos.	Player	Transferred to	Fee/notes	Date	Source
87	ST	(Canada) Tosaint Ricketts	(Lithuania) Sūduva	Option declined	November 27, 2018	
12	DF	(Puerto Rico) Jason Hernandez	Retired	Out of contract	November 27, 2018	
1	GK	(United States) Clint Irwin	(United States) Colorado Rapids	Traded for a 2019 second-round pick	December 14, 2018	
8	MF	(Spain) Ager Aketxe	(Spain) Cádiz	Contract terminated by mutual consent	December 31, 2018	
16	FW	(Argentina) Lucas Janson	(Argentina) Tigre	End of Loan	December 31, 2018	
7	MF	(Spain) Víctor Vázquez	(Qatar) Al-Arabi	Undisclosed	January 15, 2019	
6	DF	(United States) Nick Hagglund	(United States) FC Cincinnati	Traded for $200,000 in GAM, $100,000 in TAM and the #1 spot in the allocation order	January 23, 2019	
10	FW	(Italy) Sebastian Giovinco	(Saudi Arabia) Al-Hilal	Undisclosed	January 30, 2019	
9	DF	(Netherlands) Gregory van der Wiel		Contract terminated by mutual consent	March 22, 2019	
7	FW	(Canada) Jordan Hamilton	(United States) Columbus Crew	Traded for Patrick Mullins	July 10, 2019	
91	FW	(United States) Terrence Boyd	(Germany) Hallescher FC	Contract terminated by mutual consent	July 29, 2019	

==== Loan out ====
No.	Pos.	Player	Loaned to	Fee/notes	Date	Source
54	MF	(Trinidad and Tobago) Ryan Telfer	(Canada) York9 FC	Season long loan	March 6, 2019	
55	MF	(Canada) Aidan Daniels	(Canada) Ottawa Fury	Season long loan	March 6, 2019	
11	FW	(Spain) Jon Bakero	(United States) Phoenix Rising FC	Season long loan	March 20, 2019	

== Competitions ==
=== Preseason ===
January 27 Friendly	Los Angeles FC	3–1	Toronto FC	Irvine, United States
	Horta; Rossi; Vassell (pen.)	Report	Moor

February 2 Friendly	Las Vegas Lights	5–1	Toronto FC	Las Vegas, United States
	Hernández (yellow card) 29'; Harlley 38'; Parra 42'; Rivas 67', 90+1'; Arguez 86'	Report	Telfer 64'	Stadium: Cashman Field; Attendance: 5,232

February 2 Friendly	Toronto FC	Cancelled	Vissel Kobe	Irvine, United States
		Report		Stadium: Championship Soccer Stadium

February 8 Friendly	Orange County	1–1	Toronto FC	Irvine, United States
	Goal	Report	Goal	Stadium: Anteater Stadium

February 9 Friendly	LA Galaxy	1–1	Toronto FC	Carson, United States
10:30 PM EST	Mohammed (o.g.)	Report	Romney 86' (o.g.)	Stadium: Dignity Health Sports Park

February 12 Friendly	Toronto FC	0–0	Tijuana	Chula Vista, United States
2:00 PM EST		Report		Stadium: Chula Vista Elite Athlete Training Center; Attendance: 0

February 12 Friendly	Colorado Rapids	0–2	Toronto FC	Chula Vista, United States
6:30 PM EST		Report	Osorio 1'; Boyd 50'	Stadium: Chula Vista Elite Athlete Training Center; Attendance: 0
Note: Match was played with a 30-minute second half.

=== Major League Soccer ===
==== League tables ====
===== Eastern Conference =====
2019 MLS Eastern Conference standings
Pos	Team	Pld	W	L	T	GF	GA	GD	Pts	Qualification
2	Atlanta United FC	34	18	12	4	58	43	+15	58	Qualification for the first round
3	Philadelphia Union	34	16	11	7	58	50	+8	55	Qualification for the first round
4	Toronto FC	34	13	10	11	57	52	+5	50	Qualification for the first round
5	D.C. United	34	13	10	11	42	38	+4	50	Qualification for the first round
6	New York Red Bulls	34	14	14	6	53	51	+2	48	Qualification for the first round

Source: MLS
Rules for classification: 1) points; 2) total wins; 3) total goal differential; 4) total goals scored; 5) disciplinary points; 6) away goal differential; 7) away goals scored; 8) home goals scored; 9) home goal differential; 10) coin toss or drawing of lots.

===== Overall =====
2019 MLS regular season standings
Pos	Team	Pld	W	L	T	GF	GA	GD	Pts
7	Minnesota United FC	34	15	11	8	52	43	+9	53
8	LA Galaxy	34	16	15	3	58	59	−1	51
9	Toronto FC	34	13	10	11	57	52	+5	50
10	D.C. United	34	13	10	11	42	38	+4	50
11	Portland Timbers	34	14	13	7	52	49	+3	49

Source: MLS
Rules for classification: 1) points; 2) total wins; 3) total goal differential; 4) total goals scored; 5) disciplinary points; 6) away goals scored; 7) away goal differential; 8) coin toss or drawing of lots

==== Results by round ====
Round	1	2	3	4	5	6	7	8	9	10	11	12	13	14	15	16	17	18	19	20	21	22	23	24	25	26	27	28	29	30	31	32	33	34
Ground	A	H	H	H	A	H	H	A	A	H	H	A	H	A	H	A	H	A	A	A	H	H	H	A	H	A	H	A	A	A	H	A	A	H
Result	W	W	W	D	L	W	L	W	L	L	D	L	L	D	D	L	W	D	L	W	W	L	W	L	D	D	W	D	W	D	W	D	D	W

Source: Regular season matches
A = Away; H = Home; W = Win; D = Draw; L = Loss

==== Matches ====
March 2 1	Philadelphia Union	1–3	Toronto FC	Chester, Pennsylvania
1:00 PM EST	Picault (yellow card) 30'; Fabián 73' (pen.); Santos (yellow card) 81'	Report; Boxscore	Osorio (penalty missed) 34', (yellow card) 83'; Bradley 45+3', 62', (yellow card) 54'; DeLeon 90+4'	Stadium: Talen Energy Stadium; Attendance: 16,498; Referee: Nima Saghafi

March 17 2	Toronto FC	3–2	New England Revolution	Toronto, Ontario
7:30 PM EDT	Akinola 14', (yellow card) 79'; Hamilton 45'; Altidore 80'	Report; Boxscore	Gil 9' (pen.), 52', (yellow card) 45+2'	Stadium: BMO Field; Attendance: 23,271; Referee: Ted Unkel

March 29 3	Toronto FC	4–0	New York City FC	Toronto, Ontario
8:00 PM EDT	Altidore 29'; Pozuelo 59' (pen.), 78'; Chapman 83'	Report; Boxscore	Castellanos (yellow card) 66'	Stadium: BMO Field; Attendance: 25,447; Referee: Chris Penso

April 6 4	Toronto FC	2–2	Chicago Fire	Toronto, Ontario
3:00 PM EDT	Altidore 31'; Laryea (yellow card) 37'; Pozuelo (yellow card) 57'; Osorio 76'	Report; Boxscore	Katai (yellow card) 37'; Sapong 45+1'; Nikolić (yellow card) 52', (goal) 62'; Mihailovic (yellow card) 56'; Schweinsteiger (yellow card) 81'	Stadium: BMO Field; Attendance: 26,256; Referee: Armando Villarreal

April 13 5	Seattle Sounders FC	3–2	Toronto FC	Seattle, Washington
4:00 PM EDT	Bruin 24', 66'; Kim Kee-hee (yellow card) 61'; Roldan 68'; Lodeiro (yellow card) 81'; Rodríguez (yellow card) 88'	Report; Boxscore	Altidore 11', 70'	Stadium: CenturyLink Field; Attendance: 37,722; Referee: Allen Chapman

April 19 6	Toronto FC	4–3	Minnesota United FC	Toronto, Ontario
8:00 PM EDT	Pozuelo 28', 30'; Delgado (yellow card) 51'; Hamilton 77', 79'	Report; Boxscore	Quintero 17', 70' (pen.), (yellow card) 90+3'; Rodríguez 57'; Greguš (red card) 89'; Calvo (yellow card) 90' (yellow-red card) 90+1'	Stadium: BMO Field; Attendance: 22,651; Referee: Ismail Elfath

April 27 7	Toronto FC	1–2	Portland Timbers	Toronto, Ontario
3:00 PM EDT	Osorio 20'; Mavinga (yellow card) 64'	Report; Boxscore	Tuiloma 22'; Moreira (yellow card) 66'; Ebobisse 70'; Chará (yellow card) 87'	Stadium: BMO Field; Attendance: 24,832; Referee: Alex Chilowicz

May 4 8	Orlando City SC	0–2	Toronto FC	Orlando, Florida
4:00 PM EDT		Report; Boxscore	Osorio 65'; Chapman 77'	Stadium: Orlando City Stadium; Attendance: 22,377; Referee: Robert Sibiga

May 8 9	Atlanta United FC	2–0	Toronto FC	Atlanta, Georgia
7:00 PM EDT	Villalba 17'; Escobar (yellow card) 56'; Gressel 67'	Report; Boxscore	Laryea (yellow card) 21'; Zavaleta (yellow card) 74'; Bradley (yellow card) 76'; Boyd (yellow card) 77'; Osorio (yellow card) 83'	Stadium: Mercedes-Benz Stadium; Attendance: 42,537; Referee: Chris Penso

May 11 10	Toronto FC	1–2	Philadelphia Union	Toronto, Ontario
3:00 PM EDT	Pozuelo 51', (yellow card) 90+5'; Ciman (yellow card) 61'; Altidore (yellow card) 82'	Report; Boxscore	Mavinga 25' (o.g.); Bedoya (yellow card) 32'; Monteiro 68'; Trusty (yellow card) 86'; Przybylko (yellow card) 90+2'	Stadium: BMO Field; Attendance: 26,219; Referee: Ramy Touchan

May 15 11	Toronto FC	0–0	D.C. United	Toronto, Ontario
8:00 PM EDT	Morrow (yellow card) 82'	Report; Boxscore	Segura (yellow card) 61'	Stadium: BMO Field; Attendance: 26,116; Referee: Drew Fischer

May 18 12	Real Salt Lake	3–0	Toronto FC	Sandy, Utah
3:00 PM EDT	Kreilach 14'; Besler (yellow card) 25'; Saucedo 28'; Savarino 60'; Toia (yellow card) 82'	Report; Boxscore	Morgan (yellow card) 44'; Pozuelo (yellow card) 53' (yellow-red card) 61'; Altidore (yellow card) 66'	Stadium: Rio Tinto Stadium; Attendance: 15,949; Referee: Joe Dickerson

May 26 13	Toronto FC	1–2	San Jose Earthquakes	Toronto, Ontario
7:30 PM EDT	Laryea 28'; Fraser (yellow card) 61'	Report; Boxscore	Thompson (yellow card) 33'; Wondolowski 37', 81'; Espinoza (yellow card) 64'; Eriksson (yellow card) 69'	Stadium: BMO Field; Attendance: 23,524; Referee: Nima Saghafi

May 31 14	Vancouver Whitecaps FC	1–1	Toronto FC	Vancouver, British Columbia
10:00 PM EDT	Montero 84' (pen.)	Report; Boxscore	Moor (yellow card) 45+1'; DeLeon 90'	Stadium: BC Place; Attendance: 21,083; Referee: Jair Marrufo

June 7 15	Toronto FC	2–2	Sporting Kansas City	Toronto, Ontario
7:00 PM EDT	DeLeon 43', (yellow card) 72'; Laryea (yellow card) 57'; Fraser (yellow card) 89'; Ciman (yellow card) 90+3'; Hamilton 90+5'	Report; Boxscore	Gutierrez 25' (pen.), 73' (pen.); Ilie (yellow card) 74'	Stadium: BMO Field; Attendance: 24,748; Referee: Fotis Bazakos

June 22 16	FC Dallas	3–0	Toronto FC	Frisco, Texas
7:00 PM EDT	Badji 41', 58'; Bressan 51'	Report; Boxscore		Stadium: Toyota Stadium; Attendance: 13,623; Referee: Kevin Stott

June 26 17	Toronto FC	3–2	Atlanta United FC	Toronto, Ontario
8:00 PM EDT	Endoh 1'; Pozuelo 27', 90+4' (pen.); Ciman (yellow card) 69'	Report; Boxscore	González Pírez (yellow card) 11'; G. Martínez 17' (pen.), (penalty missed) 90+6'; Gressel 22'	Stadium: BMO Field; Attendance: 24,598; Referee: Alan Kelly

June 29 18	D.C. United	1–1	Toronto FC	Washington, D.C.
8:00 PM EST	Brillant (yellow card) 53'; Rooney 90+2' (pen.)	Report; Boxscore	DeLeon 19', (yellow card) 87'; Laryea (yellow card) 42'; Chapman (yellow card) 65'	Stadium: Audi Field; Attendance: 18,854; Referee: Robert Sibiga

July 4 19	LA Galaxy	2–0	Toronto FC	Carson, California
10:30 PM EDT	Steres (yellow card) 6'; F. Álvarez (yellow card) 28'; Ibrahimović 75', 89'; Polenta (yellow card) 76'	Report; Boxscore	Fraser (yellow card) 44'	Stadium: Dignity Health Sports Park; Attendance: 25,482; Referee: Ramy Touchan

July 13 20	Montreal Impact	0–2	Toronto FC	Montreal, Quebec
7:30 PM EDT	Lovitz (yellow card) 60'	Report; Boxscore	Mavinga (yellow card) 25'; Pozuelo 61'; Altidore 90+5'	Stadium: Saputo Stadium; Attendance: 19,619; Referee: Drew Fischer

July 17 21	Toronto FC	3–1	New York Red Bulls	Toronto, Ontario
8:00 PM EDT	Altidore 6'; Pozuelo 26' (pen.); Endoh (yellow card) 51'; Morgan 72'	Report; Boxscore	Murillo (yellow card) 23'; Lawrence (yellow card) 25'; Barlow 63'; Rzatkowski (yellow card) 69'; Wright-Phillips (yellow card) 89'	Stadium: BMO Field; Attendance: 24,462; Referee: Silviu Petrescu

July 20 22	Toronto FC	1–3	Houston Dynamo	Toronto, Ontario
7:30 PM EDT	Altidore 75'	Report; Boxscore	McNamara 4'; Martínez 23'; Manotas 57'	Stadium: BMO Field; Attendance: 25,949; Referee: Alex Chilowicz

July 27 23	Toronto FC	2–1	FC Cincinnati	Toronto, Ontario
8:00 PM EDT	DeLeon 16'; Altidore 50'; Moor (yellow card) 90+4'	Report; Boxscore	Deplagne (yellow card) 43'; Cruz (yellow card) 57'; Ledesma 58'; Waston (yellow card) 62'; Ulloa (yellow card) 87'	Stadium: BMO Field; Attendance: 25,765; Referee: Marcos de Oliveira

August 3 24	New York Red Bulls	2–0	Toronto FC	Harrison, New Jersey
6:00 PM EDT	Mavinga 55' (o.g.); Royer (penalty missed) 59'; Cásseres (yellow card) 68'; Long (yellow card) 70'; Lawrence 90+1'	Report; Boxscore	Pozuelo (yellow card) 84'; Morrow (red card) 89'	Stadium: Red Bull Arena; Attendance: 20,128; Referee: Jair Marrufo

August 10 25	Toronto FC	1–1	Orlando City SC	Toronto, Ontario
7:30 PM EDT	Delgado (yellow card) 34'; Mullins 77'	Report; Boxscore	Michel 69'; Sané (yellow card) 82'	Stadium: BMO Field; Attendance: 24,487; Referee: Kevin Stott

August 17 26	Columbus Crew	2–2	Toronto FC	Columbus, Ohio
7:30 PM EDT	Pedro Santos 48'; Accam 82'; Mensah (yellow card) 90+2'	Report; Boxscore	Osorio 42'; Altidore 90'	Stadium: Mapfre Stadium; Attendance: 17,494; Referee: Ramy Touchan

August 24 27	Toronto FC	2–1	Montreal Impact	Toronto, Ontario
7:30 PM EDT	Benezet (yellow card) 55'; Delgado 63'; Altidore (yellow card) 70'; Laryea (yellow card) 73'; Morrow (yellow card) 79', (goal) 81'	Report; Boxscore	Sagna (yellow card) 8'; Bojan 49'	Stadium: BMO Field; Attendance: 28,989; Referee: Baldomero Toledo

August 31 28	New England Revolution	1–1	Toronto FC	Foxborough, Massachusetts
7:30 PM EDT	Farrell (yellow card) 37'; Bou 86'	Report; Boxscore	Mavinga (yellow card) 57'; Benezet 74'	Stadium: Gillette Stadium; Attendance: 16,588; Referee: Tim Ford

September 7 29	FC Cincinnati	1–5	Toronto FC	Cincinnati, Ohio
7:30 PM EDT	Alashe (yellow card) 81'; Ledesma 90+2' (pen.)	Report; Boxscore	Mullins 10'; DeLeon 21'; Bradley (yellow card) 23', (goal) 63'; Delgado 28'; Zavaleta (yellow card) 72' (yellow-red card) 88'; Benezet 85'	Stadium: Nippert Stadium; Attendance: 25,339; Referee: Allen Chapman

September 11 30	New York City FC	1–1	Toronto FC	New York City, New York
7:00 PM EDT	Mitriță 6'; Ring (yellow card) 23'; Tinnerholm (yellow card) 40'; Johnson (yellow card) 77'; Castellanos (yellow card) 84'	Report; Boxscore	Pozuelo 40' (pen.), (penalty missed) 78'; Benezet (yellow card) 85'; Mavinga (yellow card) 90+6'	Stadium: Yankee Stadium; Attendance: 19,267; Referee: Chris Penso

September 15 31	Toronto FC	3–2	Colorado Rapids	Toronto, Ontario
5:00 PM EDT	Endoh 8'; Pozuelo 13' (pen.); Altidore (yellow card) 59'; Osorio 70'; Mavinga (yellow card) 74'	Report; Boxscore	Abubakar (yellow card) 10'; Rosenberry 31'; Kamara (penalty missed) 38'; Nicholson 62'; Rubio (yellow card) 64'	Stadium: BMO Field; Attendance: 24,810; Referee: Alex Chilowicz

September 21 32	Los Angeles FC	1–1	Toronto FC	Los Angeles, California
10:30 PM EDT	Beitashour (yellow card) 43'; Vela 90+5' (pen.)	Report; Boxscore	Endoh 19'; Laryea (yellow card) 90+1'	Stadium: Banc of California Stadium; Attendance: 22,022; Referee: Ted Unkel

September 29 33	Chicago Fire	2–2	Toronto FC	Bridgeview, Illinois
5:00 PM EDT	Katai 68'; Herbers 77'; Gaitán (yellow card) 85'	Report; Boxscore	Altidore 59'; Delgado (yellow card) 71'; Gonzalez 80'	Stadium: SeatGeek Stadium; Attendance: 17,748; Referee: Kevin Stott

October 6 34	Toronto FC	1–0	Columbus Crew	Toronto, Ontario
4:00 PM EDT	Bradley (yellow card) 39'; Pozuelo 58'; Delgado (yellow card) 76'	Report; Boxscore	Pedro Santos (yellow card) 32'	Stadium: BMO Field; Attendance: 23,692; Referee: Armando Villarreal

=== MLS Cup Playoffs ===
October 19 First round	Toronto FC	5–1 (a.e.t.)	D.C. United	Toronto, Ontario
6:00 PM EDT	Delgado 32', (yellow card) 72'; Osorio (yellow card) 40', (goal) 95', 103'; Laryea 93'; Morrow (yellow card) 102'; DeLeon 105+1'	Report; Boxscore	Rodríguez 90+3'; Jara (yellow card) 109'; Arriola (yellow card) 112' (yellow-red card) 118'	Stadium: BMO Field; Attendance: 25,331; Referee: Allen Chapman

October 23 Conference Semifinals	New York City FC	1–2	Toronto FC	New York, New York
7:00 PM EDT	Mitriță (yellow card) 30'; Tajouri-Shradi 69'	Report; Boxscore	Ciman (yellow card) 21'; Pozuelo 47', 90' (pen.); Bradley (yellow card) 77'	Stadium: Citi Field; Attendance: 19,829; Referee: Jair Marrufo

October 30 Conference Finals	Atlanta United FC	1–2	Toronto FC	Atlanta, Georgia
8:00 PM EDT	Gressel 4'; J. Martínez (penalty missed) 11'	Report; Boxscore	Bradley (yellow card) 9'; Benezet 14'; Osorio (yellow card) 61'; DeLeon (yellow card) 70', (goal) 78'	Stadium: Mercedes-Benz Stadium; Attendance: 44,055; Referee: Alan Kelly

November 10 MLS Cup	Seattle Sounders FC	3–1	Toronto FC	Seattle, Washington
3:00 PM EST	Leerdam 57'; Rodríguez 76'; Ruidíaz 90', (yellow card) 90+1'	Report; Boxscore	Pozuelo (yellow card) 72'; Altidore 90+3'	Stadium: CenturyLink Field; Attendance: 69,274; Referee: Allen Chapman

=== Canadian Championship ===
==== Semi-finals ====
August 7 First leg	Ottawa Fury	0–2	Toronto FC	Ottawa
7:30 PM EDT	Fall (yellow card) 79'	Report; Boxscore	Morrow (yellow card) 20'; Moor 30'; Zavaleta (yellow card) 48'; Fraser (yellow card) 81'; Endoh 90+1'	Stadium: TD Place Stadium; Attendance: 5,809; Referee: David Barrie

August 14 Second leg	Toronto FC	3–0 (5–0 agg.)	Ottawa Fury	Toronto
7:30 PM EDT	DeLeon 14', 39', (yellow card) 57'; Mullins 37'	Report; Boxscore		Stadium: BMO Field; Attendance: 12,683; Referee: David Gantar

==== Final ====
September 18 First leg	Montreal Impact	1–0	Toronto FC	Montreal
7:30 PM EDT	Piatti 17'; Piette (yellow card) 34'; Taïder (yellow card) 85'	Report; Boxscore		Stadium: Saputo Stadium; Attendance: 10,807; Referee: Yusri Rudolf

September 25 Second leg	Toronto FC	1–0 (1–1 agg.) (1–3 p)	Montreal Impact	Toronto
7:30 PM EDT	Bradley (yellow card) 7'; Endoh 70'; Mavinga (red card) 84'	Report; Boxscore		Stadium: BMO Field; Attendance: 21,365; Referee: Drew Fischer
	Penalties
	Pozuelo (penalty scored); Altidore (penalty missed); Mullins (penalty missed); Osorio (penalty missed)		(penalty scored) Bojan; (penalty scored) Lovitz; (penalty scored) Camacho

=== CONCACAF Champions League ===
==== Round of 16 ====
February 19 First leg	Independiente (Panama)	4–0	(Canada) Toronto FC	La Chorrera, Panama
8:00 PM EDT	González (yellow card) 6'; Ayarza 9', (yellow card) 66'; Negrete (yellow card) 31'; Browne 48', (yellow card) 48'; Ivey 52', 78', (yellow card) 78'; Barrow (yellow card) 86'	Report	Mavinga (yellow card) 15'; Boyd (penalty missed) 32'; Dorsey (yellow card) 71'	Stadium: Estadio Agustín Sánchez; Referee: Iván Barton (El Salvador)

February 26 Second leg	Toronto FC (Canada)	1–1 (1–5 agg.)	(Panama) Independiente	Toronto, Canada
8:00 PM EDT	Hamilton 19'; Bradley (yellow card) 68'	Report	Browne 67'	Stadium: BMO Field; Referee: Juan Gabriel Calderón (Costa Rica)

=== Competitions summary ===
Competition	Record								First Match	Last Match	Final Position
Competition	Pld	W	D	L	GF	GA	GD	Win %	First Match	Last Match	Final Position
MLS Regular Season	34	13	11	10	57	52	+5	38.24	March 2, 2019	October 6, 2019	4th in Eastern Conference, 9th Overall
MLS Cup Playoffs	4	3	0	1	10	6	+4	75.00	October 19, 2019	November 10, 2019	Runners-up
Canadian Championship	4	3	0	1	6	1	+5	75.00	August 7, 2019	September 25, 2019	Runners-up
Champions League	2	0	1	1	1	5	−4	0.00	February 19, 2019	February 26, 2019	Round of 16
Total	44	19	12	13	74	64	+10	43.18			

Source: Competitions

=== Goals and assists ===
Goals
Rank	Nation	Name	Pos.	Major League Soccer	MLS Cup Playoffs	Canadian Championship	Champions League	Total
1	(Spain)	Alejandro Pozuelo	MF	12	2	0	0	14
2	(United States)	Jozy Altidore	FW	11	1	0	0	12
3	(United States)	Nick DeLeon	MF	6	2	2	0	10
4	(Canada)	Jonathan Osorio	MF	5	2	0	0	7
5	(Japan)	Tsubasa Endoh	FW	3	0	2	0	5
5	(Canada)	Jordan Hamilton	FW	4	0	0	1'	5
7	(France)	Nicolas Benezet	MF	2	1	0	0	3
7	(United States)	Michael Bradley	MF	3	0	0	0	3
7	(United States)	Marky Delgado	MF	2	1	0	0	3
7	(United States)	Patrick Mullins	FW	2	0	1	0	3
11	(Canada)	Jay Chapman	MF	2	0	0	0	2
11	(Canada)	Richie Laryea	DF	1	1	0	0	2
13	(United States)	Ayo Akinola	FW	1	0	0	0	1
13	(United States)	Omar Gonzalez	DF	1	0	0	0	1
13	(United States)	Drew Moor	DF	0	0	1	0	1
13	(Canada)	Ashtone Morgan	DF	1	0	0	0	1
13	(United States)	Justin Morrow	DF	1	0	0	0	1
Own goals				0	0	0	0	0
Totals				57	10	6	1	74

Source: Toronto FC

Assists
Rank	Nation	Name	Pos.	Major League Soccer	MLS Cup Playoffs	Canadian Championship	Champions League	Total
1	(Spain)	Alejandro Pozuelo	MF	12	3	0	0	15
2	(United States)	Marky Delgado	MF	7	0	1	0	8
3	(United States)	Jozy Altidore	FW	7	0	0	0	7
4	(United States)	Nick DeLeon	MF	4	1	1	0	6
4	(Canada)	Jonathan Osorio	MF	4	1	1	0	6
6	(United States)	Michael Bradley	MF	3	1	0	0	4
6	(United States)	Justin Morrow	DF	3	0	0	1	4
8	(Brazil)	Auro Jr.	DF	3	0	0	0	3
8	(Canada)	Richie Laryea	DF	2	0	1	0	3
10	(Canada)	Jay Chapman	MF	2	0	0	0	2
10	(Belgium)	Laurent Ciman	DF	1	1	0	0	2
10	(Japan)	Tsubasa Endoh	FW	2	0	0	0	2
10	(Canada)	Jacob Shaffelburg	FW	1	0	1	0	2
14	(United States)	Ayo Akinola	FW	1	0	0	0	1
14	(Canada)	Liam Fraser	MF	1	0	0	0	1
14	(Venezuela)	Erickson Gallardo	FW	1	0	0	0	1
14	(United States)	Omar Gonzalez	DF	1	0	0	0	1
14	(Democratic Republic of the Congo)	Chris Mavinga	DF	1	0	0	0	1
14	(Trinidad and Tobago)	Ryan Telfer	MF	1	0	0	0	1
Totals				57	7	5	1	70

Source: Toronto FC

=== Shutouts ===
Rank	Nation	Name	Pos.	Major League Soccer	MLS Cup Playoffs	Canadian Championship	Champions League	Total
1	(United States)	Alex Bono	GK	1	0	3	0	4
1	(United States)	Quentin Westberg	GK	4	0	0	0	4
Totals				5	0	3	0	8

Source: Toronto FC

== Honours ==
=== MLS Team of the Week ===
Week	Starters	Bench	Coach	Opponent(s)	Link
1	(United States) Michael Bradley			Philadelphia Union	
3		(United States) Ayo Akinola		New England Revolution	
5	(Spain) Alejandro Pozuelo			New York City FC	
6		(United States) Jozy Altidore		Chicago Fire	
8	(Spain) Alejandro Pozuelo	(Canada) Jordan Hamilton		Minnesota United FC	
10	(Canada) Jonathan Osorio	(United States) Marky Delgado		Orlando City SC	
14		(Canada) Liam Fraser		Vancouver Whitecaps FC	
15	(Spain) Alejandro Pozuelo			Sporting Kansas City	
16		(United States) Quentin Westberg		FC Dallas	
19		(United States) Omar Gonzalez (Spain) Alejandro Pozuelo		Montreal Impact	
21		(United States) Nick DeLeon		FC Cincinnati	
24		(United States) Jozy Altidore		Columbus Crew	
25	(United States) Justin Morrow			Montreal Impact	
27	(United States) Nick DeLeon (United States) Marky Delgado	(Spain) Alejandro Pozuelo		FC Cincinnati	
28		(United States) Michael Bradley	(United States) Greg Vanney	New York City FC; Colorado Rapids	
29	(United States) Omar Gonzalez			Los Angeles FC	
31		(United States) Omar Gonzalez (United States) Quentin Westberg		Columbus Crew	

=== MLS Player of the Week ===
Week	Player	Opponent	Link
8	(Spain) Alejandro Pozuelo	Minnesota United FC	

=== MLS Goal of the Week ===
Week	Player	Opponent	Link
5	(Spain) Alejandro Pozuelo	New York City FC	
8	(Spain) Alejandro Pozuelo	Minnesota United FC	
15	(Canada) Jordan Hamilton	Sporting Kansas City	

=== End of Season awards ===
Award	Recipient(s)	Link
MLS Best XI	(Spain) Alejandro Pozuelo	
