= 2007 New York Red Bulls season =

New York Red Bulls
2007 season
- Chairman: Red Bull GmbH
- Manager: Bruce Arena
- Top goalscorer: League: Juan Pablo Ángel (19); All: Juan Pablo Ángel (20)
Home colors	Away colors

The 2007 season was the 12th season of New York Red Bulls's franchise existence. They played their home games at Giants Stadium in East Rutherford, New Jersey.

== Major League Soccer season ==
=== Eastern Conference ===
Eastern Conference
Pos	Club	Pts	GP	W	L	T	GF	GA	GD
1	D.C. United	55	30	16	7	7	56	34	22
2	New England Revolution	50	30	14	8	8	51	43	8
3	New York Red Bulls	43	30	12	11	7	47	45	2
4	Chicago Fire	40	30	10	10	10	31	36	-5
5	Kansas City Wizards	40	30	11	12	7	45	45	0
6	Columbus Crew	37	30	9	11	10	39	44	-5
7	Toronto FC	25	30	6	17	7	25	49	-24

=== Overall ===
Pos	Team	Pld	W	L	D	GF	GA	GD	Pts	
1	D.C. United (SS, E1)	30	16	7	7	56	34	+22	55	2008–09 CONCACAF Champions League Group stage ^{2}
2	Chivas USA (W1)	30	15	7	8	46	28	+18	53	2008–09 CONCACAF Champions League preliminary round ^{2}
3	Houston Dynamo	30	15	8	7	43	23	+20	52	2008–09 CONCACAF Champions League Group stage ^{2}
4	New England Revolution	30	14	8	8	51	43	+8	50	2008–09 CONCACAF Champions League preliminary round ^{2}
5	FC Dallas	30	13	12	5	37	44	−7	44	2007 MLS Cup Playoffs
6	New York Red Bulls	30	12	11	7	47	45	+2	43	2007 MLS Cup Playoffs
7	Chicago Fire	30	10	10	10	31	36	−5	40	2007 MLS Cup Playoffs
8	Kansas City Wizards	30	11	12	7	45	45	0	40	2007 MLS Cup Playoffs
9	Columbus Crew	30	9	11	10	39	44	−5	37	
10	Colorado Rapids	30	9	13	8	29	34	−5	35	
11	LA Galaxy	30	9	14	7	38	48	−10	34	
12	Real Salt Lake	30	6	15	9	31	45	−14	27	
13	Toronto FC ^{1}	30	6	17	7	25	49	−24	25	

- ^Note 1 – Toronto FC cannot qualify for the CONCACAF Champions League through MLS. Rather, they can qualify through the Canadian Championship.
  If they had qualified for the Champions League through MLS, then the highest placed team not already qualified would have qualified.
- ^Note 2 – The winner of the 2007 MLS Supporters' Shield (D.C. United) and the winner of MLS Cup 2007 (Houston Dynamo) qualified for the 2008 CONCACAF Champions' Cup and the 2008–09 CONCACAF Champions League Group stage. The runner-up of MLS Cup 2007 and the winner of the 2007 U.S. Open Cup (New England Revolution) qualified for the 2008–09 CONCACAF Champions League Preliminary Round. Because New England qualified twice, the additional berth in the preliminary round was awarded to the 2007 MLS Supporters' Shield runner-up (Chivas USA).

=== Matches ===
April 7 1	Columbus Crew	0–0	New York Red Bulls	Columbus, Ohio
		Report		Stadium: Columbus Crew Stadium

April 15 2	New York Red Bulls	3–0	FC Dallas	East Rutherford, New Jersey
	Altidore 18'; Mathis 34' van den Bergh 90+3'	Report		Stadium: Giants Stadium

April 21 3	New York Red Bulls	1–0	Houston Dynamo	East Rutherford, New Jersey
	Mathis (red card) 34'; Altidore 60'	Report		Stadium: Giants Stadium

April 26 4	FC Dallas	0–1	New York Red Bulls	Frisco, Texas
		Report	Freeman 79'	Stadium: Pizza Hut Park

May 5 5	Real Salt Lake	3–3	New York Red Bulls	Salt Lake City, Utah
	Klein 61'; Cunningham 90' (pen.); Brown 90+1'	Report	Richards 12'; Mathis 28', 83'	Stadium: Rice-Eccles Stadium

May 13 6	Colorado Rapids	1-0	New York Red Bulls	Commerce City, Colorado
	Hernández 24'	Report		Stadium: Colorado Rapids Stadium

May 19 7	New York Red Bulls	4–0	Columbus Crew	East Rutherford, New Jersey
	Wolyniec 17'; Mathis 51'; Ángel 61'; Caccavale 90'	Report		Stadium: Giants Stadium

May 24 8	New York Red Bulls	3–0	Chicago Fire	East Rutherford, New Jersey
	Altidore 1'; Ángel 3', 68'	Report		Stadium: Giants Stadium

June 2 9	Kansas City Wizards	3–2	New York Red Bulls	Kansas City, Missouri
	Johnson 42', 59', 85'	Report	Ángel 8'; Kovalenko 88'	Stadium: Arrowhead Stadium

June 6 10	Toronto FC	1-2	New York Red Bulls	Toronto, Ontario
	Cunningham 23'	Report	Ángel 69', 71'	Stadium: BMO Field

June 10 11	D.C. United	4–2	New York Red Bulls	Washington, D.C.
	Olsen 15', 72', 84'; Emilio 49'; Boswell (red card)	Report	Kovalenko 18'; Ángel 85'	Stadium: RFK Stadium

June 16 12	New York Red Bulls	3–3	Kansas City Wizards	East Rutherford, New Jersey
	Ángel 9', 60' (pen.); Mathis 15'	Report	Zavagnin 43'; Movsisyan 70', 79'	Stadium: Giants Stadium

June 30 13	Columbus Crew	1–0	New York Red Bulls	Columbus, Ohio
	Kamara 69'	Report		Stadium: Columbus Crew Stadium

July 5 14	Houston Dynamo	4–0	New York Red Bulls	Houston, Texas
	Ngwenya 28', 49'; Ching 32'; Holden 80'	Report		Stadium: Robertson Stadium

July 8 15	Colorado Rapids	0–1	New York Red Bulls	Commerce City, Colorado
		Report	Wolyniec 19'	Stadium: Dick's Sporting Goods Park

July 14 16	New York Red Bulls	0–1	New England Revolution	East Rutherford, New Jersey
	Ángel (red card) 90+1'	Report	Dorman 38'	Stadium: Giants Stadium

July 22 17	New York Red Bulls	1–0	D.C. United	East Rutherford, New Jersey
	Wolyniec 19'	Report	Fred (red card) 90+2'	Stadium: Giants Stadium

July 26 18	New York Red Bulls	0–2	Chivas USA	East Rutherford, New Jersey
		Report	Razov 38'; Kljestan 87'	Stadium: Giants Stadium

August 12 19	New York Red Bulls	3–0	Toronto FC	East Rutherford, New Jersey
	Ángel 24'; Altidore 50', 63'	Report		Stadium: Giants Stadium

August 18 20	New York Red Bulls	5–4	LA Galaxy	East Rutherford, New Jersey
	Ángel 4', 88'; Mathis 45+2'; Altidore 49', 70'	Report	Pavon 4', 8'; Donovan 71'; Buddle 82'	Stadium: Giants Stadium

August 22 21	D.C. United	3–1	New York Red Bulls	Washington, D.C.
	Olsen 6'; Gómez 8'; Moreno 48' (pen.)	Report	Ángel 21' (pen.)	Stadium: RFK Stadium

August 25 22	New England Revolution	2–1	New York Red Bulls	Foxborough, Massachusetts
	Twellman 46'; Mendes 80' (o.g.)	Report	Altidore 30'	Stadium: Gillette Stadium

September 1 23	New York Red Bulls	1–0	Chicago Fire	East Rutherford, New Jersey
	Ángel 75'	Report		Stadium: Giants Stadium

September 9 24	Chivas USA	3–0	New York Red Bulls	Carson, California
	Galindo 4', 58'; Razov 70' (pen.)	Report		Stadium: Home Depot Center

September 15 25	Chicago Fire	2–2	New York Red Bulls	Bridgeview, Illinois
	Blanco 54'; Conde (red card) 67'; Segares 70'	Report	van den Bergh 10'; Ángel 69' (pen.)	Stadium: Toyota Park

September 22 26	New York Red Bulls	2–2	New England Revolution	East Rutherford, New Jersey
	Doe 37'; Ángel 84'	Report	Twellman 22', 70'	Stadium: Giants Stadium

September 29 27	New York Red Bulls	2–2	Real Salt Lake	East Rutherford, New Jersey
	Doe 49'; Ángel 80' (pen.)	Report	Brown 22'; Beckerman 75'	Stadium: Giants Stadium

October 4 28	Toronto FC	2–1	New York Red Bulls	Toronto, Ontario
	Edu 18'; Leitch 66' (o.g.); Boyens (red card) 67'	Report	Vide (red card) 64'; Richards 75'	Stadium: BMO Field

October 13 29	New York Red Bulls	2–1	Kansas City Wizards	East Rutherford, New Jersey
	Ángel 19' (pen.), 24'	Report	Jewsbury 21'	Stadium: Giants Stadium

October 18 30	LA Galaxy	1–1	New York Red Bulls	Carson, California
	Roberts 15'	Report	Altidore 16'	Stadium: Home Depot Center

=== MLS Cup Playoffs ===
==== Conference semifinals ====
October 27, 2007 Leg One	New York Red Bulls	0–0	New England Revolution	East Rutherford, New Jersey
				Stadium: Giants Stadium; Attendance: 14,165

November 3, 2007 Leg Two	New England Revolution	1–0	New York Red Bulls	Foxborough, Massachusetts
	Twellman 64'			Stadium: Gillette Stadium; Attendance: 10,116

== U.S. Open Cup ==
May 8, 2007 Prelim Rd	LA Galaxy	3–1	New York Red Bulls	Carson, California
7:30 PM EDT	Donovan; Martino; Quaranta	Report	Ángel	Stadium: Home Depot Center

== Player statistics ==
=== Top scorers ===
Place	Position	Number	Name	MLS	MLS Cup	U.S. Open Cup	Total
1	FW	9	(Colombia) Juan Pablo Ángel	19	0	1	20
2	FW	17	(United States) Jozy Altidore	9	0	0	9
3	MF	13	(United States) Clint Mathis	6	0	0	6
4	FW	15	(United States) John Wolyniec	3	0	0	3
5	MF	11	(Netherlands) Dave van den Bergh	2	0	0	2
5	MF	19	(Jamaica) Dane Richards	2	0	0	2
5	MF	21	(Ukraine) Dema Kovalenko	2	0	0	2
5	FW	30	(Liberia) Francis Doe	2	0	0	2
6	DF	3	(United States) Hunter Freeman	1	0	0	1
6	MF	25	(United States) Sal Caccavale	1	0	0	1
Total				47	0	1	48

As of December 31, 2007.

== See also ==
- 2007 Major League Soccer season
