= 2026 Toronto FC II season =

Toronto FC II
2026 season
- Owner: Maple Leaf Sports & Entertainment
- Manager: Gianni Cimini

The 2026 Toronto FC II season is the eleventh season of play in the club's history and their fifth season in MLS Next Pro.

== Team roster ==
MLS Next Pro allows for up to 35 players on a roster. Roster slots 1 through 24 are reserved for players on professional contracts. The remaining 11 slots are for amateur MLS Academy players (who are unpaid, must be under the age of 21, be part of the team's academy, and have never signed a professional contract or played in the NCAA).

=== Roster ===
As of August 13, 2026

No.	Pos.	Nation	Player
50	GK	CAN	Dominic Kantorowicz
56	MF	CAN	Antone Bossenberry
58	DF	CAN	Marko Stojadinovic
61	MF	CAN	Tim Fortier
63	MF	CAN	Shyon Pinnock
64	FW	JAM	Jahmarie Nolan
65	MF	JAM	Raequan Campbell-Dennis
66	MF	CAN	Diego Nue-Brito
67	FW	CAN	Kervon Kerr
68	FW	CAN	Demitre Adamson
69	MF	CAN	Tristan Blyth
70	GK	CAN	Harrison Patterson
72	DF	CAN	Daniel Stampatori
73	DF	CAN	Micah Chisholm
74	DF	DEN	Luca Costabile
75	DF	USA	Reid Fisher
79	MF	USA	Fletcher Bank
80	GK	CAN	Zakaria Nakhly
81	CB	CAN	Niko Brodar
82	MF	USA	Bryce Boneau
83	DF	CAN	Edwin Omoregbe
84	FW	FRA	Elias Khodri
85	MF	CAN	Spencer Sappleton
86	MF	CIV	Abundance Salaou
87	MF	CAN	Lucas Dawson
89	DF	CAN	Gabriel Mikina
89	MF	CAN	Diego Jaleau
91	FW	CAN	Dékwon Barrow
92	DF	CAN	Theo Rigopoulos
93	MF	CAN	Damar Dixon (on loan from Frosinone)
95	MF	CAN	Daniel Eniang-Olatunji

Toronto FC Academy player

First team players who have been loaned to TFC II in 2026
No.	Position	Player	Nation
71	MF	CAN	Markus Cimermancic
76	DF	CAN	Lazar Stefanovic
77	GK	CAN	Adisa De Rosario
78	MF	CAN	Malik Henry
96	DF	CAN	Richard Chukwu
98	DF	CAN	Stefan Kapor

Toronto FC Academy player
No longer on first team roster

Players no longer on roster
No.	Position	Nation	Player
38	DF	USA	Jackson Gilman
60	GK	CAN	Christopher Kalongo
62	FW	CAN	Joshua Nugent

== Coaching staff ==
As of November 15, 2022

Coaching staff
Head coach	(Canada) Gianni Cimini
Assistant coach	(Canada) Marco Casalinuovo
Assistant coach	(Canada) Arman Mohammadi
Goalkeeping coach	(Canada) David Monsalve

== Transfers ==
Note: All figures in United States dollars.

=== In ===
==== Transferred In ====
No.	Pos.	Player	From	Fee/notes	Date	Source
82	MF	(United States) Bryce Boneau	(United States) Huntsville City FC		January 20, 2026	
74	DF	(Denmark) Luca Costabile	(United States) Maryland Terrapins		January 20, 2026	
60	GK	(Canada) Christopher Kalongo	(Canada) Forge FC		February 5, 2026	
72	DF	(Canada) Daniel Stampatori	(Canada) Lipscomb Bisons		February 5, 2026	
86	MF	(Ivory Coast) Abundance Salaou	(Sweden) IFK Göteborg	Transfer	February 19, 2026	
38	DF	(United States) Jackson Gilman	(United States) Pittsburgh Panthers	First Team draft pick	February 20, 2026	
79	MF	(United States) Fletcher Bank	(United States) Stanford Cardinal	First team draft pick	February 20, 2026	
84	FW	(France) Elias Khodri	(United States) New Hampshire Wildcats		February 26, 2026	
80	GK	(Canada) Zakaria Nakhly	(Canada) Ottawa South United		February 27, 2026	
58	DF	(Canada) Marko Stojadinovic	(Canada) Atlético Ottawa	Signed as free agent	May 21, 2026	
89	DF	(Canada) Gabriel Mikina	(France) SC Toulon		August 13, 2026	

==== Loaned in ====
No.	Pos.	Player	From	Fee/notes	Date	Source
93	FW	(Canada) Damar Dixon	(Italy) Frosinone	Loan through June 30, 2026; Extended to end of 2026	January 30, 2026	

=== Out ===
==== Transferred out ====
No.	Pos.	Player	To	Fee/notes	Date	Source
85	DF	(Canada) Marko Stojadinovic	(Canada) Atlético Ottawa	Option declined	November 17, 2025	
68	DF	(Canada) Lucas Olguin	(Canada) HFX Wanderers FC	Option declined	November 17, 2024	
82	MF	(United States) Patrick McDonald	(United States) St. Louis City SC 2	Option declined	November 17, 2024	
74	MF	(United States) Michael Sullivan	(United States) FC Cincinnati 2	Option declined	November 15, 2024	
80	GK	(Canada) Shafique Wilson	(Finland) Mikkelin Palloilijat	Contract expired	November 15, 2024	
81	FW	(England) Hassan Ayari	(Bulgaria) Vihren Sandanski	Contract expired	November 15, 2024	
72	MF	(Canada) Mark Fisher	(United States) Oakland Roots SC	Contract expired	November 15, 2024	
87	MF	(Canada) Costa Iliadis	(United States) Clemon Tigers	Contract expired	November 17, 2025	
	GK	(Colombia) Felipe Jaramillo	(Canada) Vancouver FC	Loan expired	December 31, 2025	
98	DF	(Canada) Stefan Kapor	(Canada) Toronto FC	Promoted to first team	December 31, 2025	
58	DF	(Brazil) Ythallo	(Brazil) Botafogo	Transfer	January 4, 2026	
86	FW	(Liberia) Joseph Melto Quiah	(United States) New Mexico United	Transfer	February 12, 2026	
60	GK	(Canada) Christopher Kalongo	(Canada) Atlético Ottawa	Mutual termination	May 19, 2026	
38	DF	(United States) Jackson Gilman	(Canada) Toronto FC	Signed with first team	May 22, 2026	
62	FW	(Canada) Joshua Nugent		Mutual termination	July 3, 2026	
96	DF	(Canada) Richard Chukwu	(Canada) Toronto FC	Signed with first team	July 16, 2026	

==== Loaned out ====
No.	Pos.	Player	To	Fee/notes	Date	Source
64	FW	(Jamaica) Jahmarie Nolan	(Canada) Toronto FC	Short-term loan (April 11, May 2, May 5, May 9)	April 11, 2026	
96	DF	(Canada) Richard Chukwu	(Canada) Toronto FC	Short-term loan (April 11)	April 11, 2026	
75	DF	(United States) Reid Fisher	(Canada) Toronto FC	Short-term loan (April 18, April 22, April 25, May 5)	April 18, 2026	
38	DF	(United States) Jackson Gilman	(Canada) Toronto FC	Short-term loan (April 18, April 25, May 5, May 16)	April 18, 2026	
56	MF	(Canada) Antone Bossenberry	(Canada) Toronto FC	Short-term loan (April 25, May 2, May 5)	April 15, 2026	
73	DF	(Canada) Micah Chisholm	(Canada) Toronto FC	Short-term loan (May 2, May 9)	May 2, 2026	
79	MF	(United States) Fletcher Bank	(Canada) Toronto FC	Short-term loan (May 2, May 5, May 9, May 16)	May 2, 2026	
91	FW	(Canada) Dékwon Barrow	(Canada) Toronto FC	Short-term loan (May 16)	May 16, 2026	
74	DF	(Denmark) Luca Costabile	(Canada) Toronto FC	Short-term loan (May 16)	May 16, 2026	

== Pre-season and friendlies ==
Win Draw Loss Fixtures

January 30, 2026 Friendly	Toronto FC II	2–0	(Canada) Woodbridge Strikers

February 7, 2026 Friendly	Toronto FC II	2–2	(Canada) FC Supra du Québec

February 14, 2026 Friendly	Toronto FC II	1–0	(United States) Pittsburgh Panthers

February 21, 2026 Friendly	Toronto FC II	0–2	(United States) Detroit City FC

== Competitions ==
=== MLS Next Pro ===
==== Standings ====
Eastern Conference

Pos	Div	Team	Pld	W	SOW	SOL	L	GF	GA	GD	Pts
10	SE	Orlando City B	28	11	4	3	10	55	56	−1	44
11	NE	Philadelphia Union II	28	12	2	3	11	37	40	−3	43
12	NE	Toronto FC II	28	11	2	2	13	48	56	−8	39
13	SE	Chicago Fire FC II	28	10	3	3	12	50	48	+2	39
14	SE	Carolina Core FC	28	5	5	6	12	40	53	−13	31

Source: MLSNP
Rules for classification: 1) Points; 2) Total regulation wins; 3) Total goal differential; 4) Total goals scored; 5) Total shootout wins; 6) Away goal differential; 7) Away goals scored; 8) Home goals differential; 9) Home goals scored; 10) Fewer disciplinary points; 11) Drawing of lots.

Overall table

Pos	Div	Team	Pld	W	SOW	SOL	L	GF	GA	GD	Pts
20	PC	Tacoma Defiance	28	11	3	2	12	40	44	−4	41
21	FR	North Texas SC	28	8	6	4	10	42	41	+1	40
22	NE	Toronto FC II	28	11	2	2	13	48	56	−8	39
23	SE	Chicago Fire FC II	28	10	3	3	12	50	48	+2	39
24	PC	Real Monarchs	28	8	4	1	15	38	55	−17	33

Source: MLSNP
Rules for classification: 1) Points; 2) Total regulation wins; 3) Total goal differential; 4) Total goals scored; 5) Total shootout wins; 6) Away goal differential; 7) Away goals scored; 8) Home goals differential; 9) Home goals scored; 10) Fewer disciplinary points; 11) Drawing of lots.

==== Match results ====
February 28, 2026 1	Philadelphia Union 2	1–0	Toronto FC II	Chester, Pennsylvania
3:00 PM	Jakupovic 8'	Report		Stadium: Subaru Park; Referee: Luis Diego Arroyo

March 8, 2026 2	New England Revolution II	0–0 (7–6 SO)	Toronto FC II	Smithfield, Rhode Island
5:00 PM		Report		Stadium: Beirne Stadium; Referee: Lauren Aldrich
	Shootout
	Da (penalty missed); Siqueira (penalty scored); Oyirwoth (penalty scored); Shannon (penalty scored); McIntosh (penalty scored); Oliveira (penalty scored); Morgan (penalty scored); Wells (penalty scored)		Khodri (penalty scored); Bank (penalty scored); Nolan (penalty scored); Fisher (penalty missed); Gilman (penalty scored); Fortier (penalty scored); Chisholm (penalty scored); Kapor (penalty scored)

March 15, 2026 3	Columbus Crew 2	3–2	Toronto FC II	Columbus, Ohio
3:00 PM	Adams 52', 68'; Zengue 90'	Report	Nolan 57'; Dixon 73'	Stadium: ScottsMiracle-Gro Field; Referee: Elvis Osmanovic

March 19, 2026 4	New York City FC II	0–5	Toronto FC II	Queens, New York
7:00 PM		Report	Bank 24', 72'; Kerr 45+1'; Salaou 64'; Khodri 68'	Stadium: Belson Stadium; Referee: Gary Gutierrez

April 12, 2026 5	Toronto FC II	3–3 (1–3 SO)	Crown Legacy FC	Toronto, Ontario
1:00 PM	Nolan 8' (pen.), 35'; Bank 83'	Report	Berchimas 17', 22'; Mbongue 66' (pen.)	Stadium: York Lions Stadium; Referee: Sebastian Noshinravani
	Shootout
	Bank (penalty missed); Cimermancic (penalty missed); Bossenberry (penalty scored); Nugent (penalty missed)		Mbongue (penalty scored); Peña (penalty scored); Subotić (penalty scored)

April 17, 2026 6	Toronto FC II	1–0	Philadelphia Union II	Toronto, Ontario
7:00 PM	Uzcátegui 35' (o.g.)	Report		Stadium: York Lions Stadium; Referee: Yusri Rudolf

April 24, 2026 7	Toronto FC II	2–1	New York City FC II	Toronto, Ontario
7:00 PM	Dixon 47'; Nolan 80'	Report	Duque 90+1'	Stadium: York Lions Stadium; Referee: Fabrizio Stasolla

May 3, 2026 8	FC Cincinnati 2	5–0	Toronto FC II	Highland Heights, Kentucky
7:00 PM	Chirilă 48', 60'; Dilan Hurtado Hinestroza 51'; Sullivan 80'; Vásquez 86'	Report		Stadium: NKU Soccer Stadium; Referee: Anthony Sobolevsky

May 8, 2026 9	Toronto FC II	1–2	Red Bull New York II	Toronto, Ontario
11:00 AM	Kerr 82'	Report	Worth 65'; Rojas 78'	Stadium: York Lions Stadium; Referee: Thomas Noel

May 16, 2026 10	CT United FC	0–2	Toronto FC II	New Haven, Connecticut
7:00 PM		Report	Nué-Brito 86'; Khodri 90+4'	Stadium: Reese Stadium; Referee: Ryan Homik

May 24, 2026 11	Columbus Crew 2	2–2 (1–3 SO)	Toronto FC II	Columbus, Ohio
8:00PM	Adams 51'; Gbamblé 90+2'	Report	Boneau 6'; Nolan 75'	Stadium: ScottsMiracle-Gro Field; Referee: Alex Beehler
	Shootout
	Adu-Gyamfi (penalty missed); Zengue (penalty missed); Rincón (penalty scored); Mrowka (penalty missed)		Bank (penalty missed); Nolan (penalty scored); Chisholm (penalty scored); Fisher (penalty missed); Pinnock (penalty scored)

May 29, 2026 12	Toronto FC II	2–1	Philadelphia Union 2	Toronto, Ontario
7:00 PM	Bank 41'; Blyth 51'	Report	De Paula 61'	Stadium: York Lions Stadium; Referee: Ben Hoskins

June 5, 2026 13	Toronto FC II	2–1	Huntsville City FC	Toronto, Ontario
7:00 PM	Fisher 16'; Bossenberry 40'	Report	Ekk 90+3'	Stadium: York Lions Stadium; Referee: Nicolas Melita

June 14, 2026 14	Toronto FC II	2–4	CT United FC	Toronto, Ontario
3:00 PM	Dixon 22'; Kerr 82'	Report	D'lppolito 33', 36'; Monis 63' (pen.); Applewhaite 88' (pen.)	Stadium: York Lions Stadium; Referee: Fabrizio Stasolla

June 21, 2026 15	Red Bull New York II	5–0	Toronto FC II	Montclair, New Jersey
7:00 PM	Jiménez 11'; Rodriguez 46', 80'; Munson 83'; Baitinger 84'	Report		Stadium: MSU Soccer Park at Pittser Field; Referee: Stephen Foster

June 28, 2026 16	Toronto FC II	1–3	New England Revolution II	Toronto, Ontario
3:00 PM	Nolan 27'	Report	Smith 53'; Morgan 87'; Oyirwoth 90+1'	Stadium: York Lions Stadium; Referee: Sebastian Noshinravani

July 4, 2026 17	Atlanta United FC 2	1–0	Toronto FC II	Athens, Georgia
7:00 PM	Chica 34'	Report		Stadium: Turner Soccer Complex; Referee: Deny Kulasinac

July 12, 2026 18	CT United FC	3–2	Toronto FC II	New Haven, Connecticut
6:00 PM	Monis 41'; Tanyi 66'; Paixão 83'	Report	Barrow 60'; Nolan 71'	Stadium: Reese Stadium; Referee: Marie Durr

July 17, 2026 19	Toronto FC II	3–1	FC Cincinnati 2	Toronto, Ontario
7:00 PM	Dawson 11'; Bossenberry 26'; Khodri 36'	Report	Holmes 77'	Stadium: York Lions Stadium; Referee: Saman Soltani

July 25, 2026 20	Inter Miami CF II	2–1	Toronto FC II	Fort Lauderdale, Florida
7:00 PM	Saja 18'; Delinois 58'	Report	Fisher 29'	Stadium: Inter Miami CF Stadium; Referee: John Tamayo

August 10, 2026 22	Chicago Fire FC II	2–4	Toronto FC II	Bridgeview, Illinois
3:00 PM	Villanueva 45+4'; Diawara 57'	Report	Blyth 24', 45+3'; Khodri 89'; Nolan 90+5'	Stadium: SeatGeek Stadium; Referee: Braeden Frey
Note: Postponed from August 8

August 14, 2026 23	Toronto FC II	2–2 (5–4 SO)	Chattanooga FC	Toronto, Ontario
7:00 PM	Nolan 11'; Dixon 90+4'	Report	Krehl 24'; Sar-Sar 82'	Stadium: York Lions Stadium; Referee: Thomas Noel
	Shootout
	Nolan (penalty scored); Dixon (penalty scored); Dawson (penalty scored); Costabile (penalty scored); Stojadinovic (penalty scored)		García (penalty scored); Sid Mohand (penalty scored); Cohen (penalty missed); Husakiwsky (penalty scored); Sar-Sar (penalty missed)

August 23, 2026 24	Red Bull New York II	5–1	Toronto FC II	Montclair, New Jersey
7:00 PM	Gjengaar 20', 42'; Rojas 53'; Nelich 61'; Gallagher 67'	Report	Khodri 4'	Stadium: MSU Soccer Park; Referee: Carlos Rodriguez

August 28, 2026 25	Toronto FC II	2–0	New York City FC II	Toronto, Ontario
7:00 PM	Nolan 16' (pen.); Henry 29'	Report		Stadium: York Lions Stadium; Referee: Melvin Christopher

September 4, 2026 26	Toronto FC II	2–1	FC Cincinnati 2	Toronto, Ontario
7:00 PM	Dixon 20'; Boneau 49'	Report	Niang 15'	Stadium: York Lions Stadium; Referee: Nicolas Melita

September 8, 2026 21	Toronto FC II	4–2	Columbus Crew 2	Toronto, Ontario
7:00 PM	Boneau 5'; Stampatori 30'; Dixon 31'; Costabile 90'	Report	Adams 65'; Gbamblé 89' (pen.)	Stadium: York Lions Stadium; Referee: Thomas Noel
Note: Postponed from July 31

September 13, 2026 27	Orlando City SC B	3–1	Toronto FC II	Kissimmee, Florida
7:00 PM	Gómez 27'; Caraballo 43'; Sarajian 58'	Report	Khodri 85' (pen.)	Stadium: Osceola Heritage Park; Referee: Russell Miller

September 20, 2026 28	Toronto FC II	1–3	New England Revolution II	Toronto, Ontario
2:00 PM	Costabile 45'	Report	Morgan 43'; Mussenden 62'; McIntosh 84'	Stadium: York Lions Stadium; Referee: Mario Al-Ayass

== Statistics ==
=== Goals ===
Rank	Nation	Player	MLS Next Pro	Playoffs	Total
1	(Jamaica)	Jahmarie Nolan	10	-	10
2	(Canada)	Damar Dixon	6	-	6
2	(France)	Elias Khodri	6	-	6
4	(United States)	Fletcher Bank	4	-	4
5	(Canada)	Tristan Blyth	3	-	3
5	(Canada)	Kervon Kerr	3	-	3
5	(United States)	Bryce Boneau	3	-	3
8	(Canada)	Antone Bossenberry	2	-	2
8	(Denmark)	Luca Costabile	1	-	1
8	(United States)	Reid Fisher	2	-	2
11	(Canada)	Dékwon Barrow	1	-	1
11	(Canada)	Lucas Dawson	1	-	1
11	(Canada)	Malik Henry	1	-	1
11	(Canada)	Diego Nué-Brito	1	-	1
11	(Ivory Coast)	Abundance Salaou	1	-	1
11	(Canada)	Daniel Stampatori	1	-	1
Own goals			1	0	1
Totals			41	0	41

Updated to match played September 20, 2026
Source: Stats Crew

No longer on roster

=== Shutouts ===
Rank	Nation	Player	Pos.	MLS Next Pro	Playoffs	Total
1	(Canada)	Zakaria Nakhly	GK	3	-	3
2	(Canada)	Adisa De Rosario	GK	2	-	2
Totals				5	0	5

Updated to match played September 4, 2026
Source: Stats Crew
