= 2026 Toronto FC season =

Toronto FC 2026 soccer season

Toronto FC
2026 season
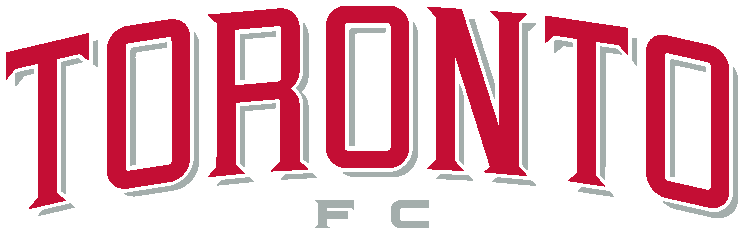
- Owner: Maple Leaf Sports & Entertainment
- President: Vacant
- Head coach: Robin Fraser
- Stadium: BMO Field
- Major League Soccer: Conference: 12th Overall: 24th
- MLS Cup playoffs: Did not qualify
- Canadian Championship: Preliminary round
- Top goalscorer: League: Josh Sargent (10); All: Josh Sargent (10)
- Average home league attendance: 19,685
- Biggest win: NYR 0–2 TOR (October 17)
- Biggest defeat: VAN 3–0 TOR (February 28); ORL 3–0 TOR (September 12); PHI 4–1 TOR (November 7)
Home colours	Away colours

The 2026 Toronto FC season was the 20th season in the history of Toronto FC, and the second under the leadership of manager Robin Fraser.

== Squad ==
As of October 13, 2026

No.	Player	Nationality	Position(s)	Date of birth (age)	Previous club	Notes
Goalkeepers
1	Luka Gavran	(Canada)	GK	May 9, 2000 (age 26)	(Canada) Toronto FC II	
23	William Yarbrough	(United States)	GK	March 20, 1989 (age 37)	(United States) Inter Miami CF	
77	Adisa De Rosario	(Canada) (United States)	GK	October 27, 2004 (age 22)	(Canada) Toronto FC II	HG
Defenders
3	Matheus Pereira	(Brazil)	LB	December 21, 2000 (age 25)	(Portugal) Santa Clara	
12	Zane Monlouis	(England) (Jamaica)	CB	October 16, 2003 (age 23)	(England) Arsenal	
13	Benjamín Kuscevic	(Chile)	CB	May 2, 1996 (age 30)	(Brazil) Fortaleza	On loan
15	Nicksoen Gomis	(France)	LB	March 15, 2002 (age 24)	(England) Sheffield United	
19	Kobe Franklin	(Canada)	RB	May 10, 2003 (age 23)	(Canada) Toronto FC II	HG
22	Richie Laryea	(Canada)	RB / RM	January 7, 1995 (age 31)	(England) Nottingham Forest	
25	Walker Zimmerman	(United States)	CB	October 18, 2002 (age 24)	(United States) Nashville SC	
38	Jackson Gilman	(United States)	RB / CB	April 29, 2004 (age 22)	(Canada) Toronto FC II	
44	Raheem Edwards	(Canada)	LB / LM	July 17, 1995 (age 31)	(United States) New York Red Bulls	
76	Lazar Stefanovic	(Canada)	CB	August 10, 2006 (age 20)	(Canada) Toronto FC II	HG
96	Richard Chukwu	(Canada)	CB / LB	February 25, 2008 (age 18)	(Canada) Toronto FC II	HG
98	Stefan Kapor	(Canada)	CB	April 4, 2009 (age 17)	(Canada) Toronto FC II	HG
Midfielders
6	Niklas Dorsch	(Germany)	DM	January 15, 1998 (age 28)	(Germany) 1. FC Heidenheim	
8	Nelson Palacio	(Colombia)	DM / CM	June 16, 2001 (age 25)	(United States) Real Salt Lake	
10	Djordje Mihailovic	(United States)	AM	September 10, 1998 (age 28)	(United States) Colorado Rapids	DP
14	Alonso Coello	(Spain)	CM	October 12, 1999 (age 27)	(Canada) Toronto FC II	
21	Jonathan Osorio	(Canada)	AM / CM	June 12, 1992 (age 34)	(Canada) SC Toronto	Captain
56	Antone Bossenberry	(Canada)	MF	August 14, 2008 (age 18)	(Canada) Toronto FC II	HG
71	Markus Cimermancic	(Slovenia) (Canada)	MF	October 1, 2004 (age 22)	(Canada) Toronto FC II	HG
78	Malik Henry	(Canada)	MF	July 23, 2002 (age 24)	(Canada) Toronto FC II	
Forwards
7	Theo Corbeanu	(Canada)	RW	May 17, 2002 (age 24)	(Spain) Granada	
9	Josh Sargent	(United States)	CF	February 20, 2000 (age 26)	(England) Norwich City	DP
11	Derrick Etienne Jr.	(Haiti) (United States)	FW	November 25, 1996 (age 29)	(United States) Atlanta United FC	
17	Emilio Aristizábal	(Colombia)	CF	August 5, 2005 (age 21)	(Colombia) Atlético Nacional	On loan
20	Dániel Sallói	(Hungary)	LW	July 19, 1996 (age 30)	(United States) Sporting Kansas City	
27	Alejandro Piedrahita	(Colombia)	LW / RW	September 3, 2002 (age 24)	(Bulgaria) CSKA Sofia	On loan
90	Lewis Morgan	(Scotland)	LW	September 30, 1996 (age 30)	(United States) San Diego FC	
99	Jules-Anthony Vilsaint	(Canada)	CF	January 6, 2003 (age 23)	(Canada) CF Montréal	
Out on loan
51	Adam Pearlman (at Cavalry FC)	(Canada)	CB	April 5, 2005 (age 21)	(Canada) HFX Wanderers FC	HG

== Transfers ==
Note: All figures in United States dollars.

=== In ===
==== Transfers in ====
No.	Pos.	Player	From	Fee/notes	Date	Source
98	CB	(Canada) Stefan Kapor	(Canada) Toronto FC II	Homegrown player contract; joined January 1, 2026	October 3, 2025	
7	RW	(Canada) Theo Corbeanu	(Spain) Granada	Purchase option exercised	October 24, 2025	
3	LB	(Brazil) Matheus Pereira	(Portugal) Santa Clara	Undisclosed fee	December 29, 2025	
25	CB	(United States) Walker Zimmerman	—N/a	Free agent	January 2, 2026	
23	GK	(United States) William Yarbrough	—N/a	Free agent	January 16, 2026	
20	LB	(Canada) Raheem Edwards	(United States) New York Red Bulls	Claimed off waivers	February 17, 2026	
20	LW	(Hungary) Dániel Sallói	(United States) Sporting Kansas City	$300,000 in general allocation money (GAM) split across two seasons & up to $700,000 in conditional GAM	February 19, 2026	
9	CF	(United States) Josh Sargent	(England) Norwich City	Designated player contract and an undisclosed fee; $500,000 in GAM for St. Louis City SC's right of first refusal	February 27, 2026	
38	DF	(United States) Jackson Gilman	(Canada) Toronto FC II	Deal for 2026 with options for 2027 & 2028	May 22, 2026	
8	MF	(Colombia) Nelson Palacio	(United States) Real Salt Lake	$1,100,000 in GAM & up to $550,000 in conditional GAM	July 6, 2026	
96	DF	(Canada) Richard Chukwu	(Canada) Toronto FC II	Home grown deal to 2029–30 with option for 2030–31	July 16, 2026	
6	DM	(Germany) Niklas Dorsch	(Germany) 1. FC Heidenheim	Undisclosed fee	July 28, 2026	
90	LW	(Scotland) Lewis Morgan	(United States) San Diego FC	Trade for 2026 international roster slot	September 2, 2026	
56	MF	(Canada) Antone Bossenberry	(Canada) Toronto FC II	Home grown deal to 2028–29 with options for 2029–30 & 2030–31	October 13, 2026	

==== Loans in ====
No.	Pos.	Player	From	Fee/notes	Date	Source
17	CF	(Colombia) Emilio Aristizábal	(Colombia) Atlético Nacional	Season-long loan	February 17, 2026	
13	DF	(Chile) Benjamín Kuscevic	(Brazil) Fortaleza	Season-long loan	March 4, 2026	
64	FW	(Jamaica) Jahmarie Nolan	(Canada) Toronto FC II	Short-term loan (April 11, May 2, May 5, May 9)	April 11, 2026	
96	DF	(Canada) Richard Chukwu	(Canada) Toronto FC II	Short-term loan (April 11)	April 11, 2026	
75	DF	(United States) Reid Fisher	(Canada) Toronto FC II	Short-term loan (April 18, April 22, April 25, May 5)	April 18, 2026	
38	DF	(United States) Jackson Gilman	(Canada) Toronto FC II	Short-term loan (April 18, April 25, May 5, May 16)	April 18, 2026	
56	MF	(Canada) Antone Bossenberry	(Canada) Toronto FC II	Short-term loan (April 25, May 2, May 5)	April 25, 2026	
73	DF	(Canada) Micah Chisholm	(Canada) Toronto FC II	Short-term loan (May 2, May 9)	May 2, 2026	
79	MF	(United States) Fletcher Bank	(Canada) Toronto FC II	Short-term loan (May 2, May 5, May 9, May 16)	May 2, 2026	
91	FW	(Canada) Dékwon Barrow	(Canada) Toronto FC II	Short-term loan (May 16)	May 16, 2026	
74	DF	(Denmark) Luca Costabile	(Canada) Toronto FC II	Short-term loan (May 16)	May 16, 2026	
27	FW	(Colombia) Alejandro Piedrahita	(Bulgaria) CSKA Sofia	Loan through 2027 season with an option to purchase	September 4, 2026	

==== MLS SuperDraft picks ====
2026 Toronto FC SuperDraft Picks
Round	Selection	Player	Position	College	Status
2	36	(United States) Jackson Gilman	DF	University of Pittsburgh	Signed with Toronto FC II

=== Out ===
==== Transfers out ====
No.	Pos.	Player	To	Fee/notes	Date	Source
1	GK	(United States) Sean Johnson	(United States) D.C. United	Contract option declined; signed with D.C. United on December 23, 2025	October 24, 2025	
5	CB	(Republic of Ireland) Kevin Long	(Republic of Ireland) Waterford	Contract option declined; signed with Waterford on March 15, 2026	October 24, 2025	
28	LB	(Italy) Raoul Petretta	(Germany) Darmstadt 98	Contract option declined; signed with Darmstadt 98 on January 20, 2026	October 24, 2025	
17	CB	(Norway) Sigurd Rosted	(Norway) Sarpsborg 08	Contract option declined; signed with Sarpsborg 08 on January 22, 2026	October 24, 2025	
25	LW	(Canada) Nathaniel Edwards	(Canada) Cavalry FC	Contract option declined; signed with Cavalry FC on February 9, 2026	October 24, 2025	
83	CF	(Canada) Hugo Mbongue	(United States) Crown Legacy FC	Contract option declined; signed with Crown Legacy FC on February 27, 2026	October 24, 2025	
38	CF	(United States) Charlie Sharp	(United States) Indy Eleven	Contract option declined; signed with Indy Eleven on December 2, 2025	October 24, 2025	
6	RB	(Canada) Kosi Thompson	(United States) Colorado Rapids	Traded for $200,000 in 2026 GAM and $200,000 conditional GAM	March 26, 2026	
2	RB	(United States) Henry Wingo	Unattached	Contract bought out	July 3, 2026	
—	CF	(South Africa) Cassius Mailula	Unattached	Contract terminated	July 3, 2026	
29	CF	(Canada) Deandre Kerr	(Portugal) AVS	Undisclosed fee	September 4, 2026	

==== Loans out ====
No.	Pos.	Player	To	Fee/notes	Date	Source
51	CB	(Canada) Adam Pearlman	(Canada) Cavalry FC	Season-long loan	March 23, 2026	

== Preseason ==
On January 26, 2026, Toronto FC finalized their preseason schedule.

=== Matches ===
January 28 Friendly	Toronto FC	4–1	Incheon United
		Report
Note: Closed-door scrimmage

January 31 Friendly	Toronto FC	2–0	Jeonbuk Hyundai Motors
	Mihailovic 8'; Laryea 56'	Report

February 7 Friendly	Toronto FC	2–2	AIK
	Kerr 13'; Cimermancic 90+5'	Report	Hove 51' (pen.); Celina 79'

February 11 Friendly	Toronto FC	0–1	Fredrikstad
		Report	Skogvold 69'

February 14 Friendly	Toronto FC	2–1	Polissya Zhytomyr
		Report
Note: Closed-door scrimmage

== Competitions ==
=== Major League Soccer ===
==== League tables ====
Eastern Conference

MLS Eastern Conference table (2026)
Pos	Team	Pld	Pts
10	New York Red Bulls	34	42
11	New York City FC	34	42
12	Toronto FC	34	39
13	Atlanta United FC	34	33
14	D.C. United	34	33

Source: MLS

Overall

Overall MLS standings table
Pos	Team	Pld	Pts
22	New York Red Bulls	34	42
23	New York City FC	34	42
24	Toronto FC	34	39
25	San Diego FC	34	38
26	Austin FC	34	34

Source: MLS

==== Matches ====
February 22 1	FC Dallas	3–2	Toronto FC	Frisco, Texas
6:30 PM	Musa 9', 74', (yellow card) 45+4'; Farrington 38'	Report	Mihailovic 15'; Henry (yellow card) 21'; Etienne 67'; Edwards (yellow card) 90+4'	Stadium: Toyota Stadium; Attendance: 11,004; Referee: Tim Ford

March 1 2	Vancouver Whitecaps FC	3–0	Toronto FC	Vancouver, British Columbia
9:30 PM	Müller 25' (pen.), 37'; White 45+2'; Ocampo (yellow card) 66'	Report		Stadium: BC Place; Attendance: 24,533; Referee: Fotis Bazakos

March 8 3	FC Cincinnati	0–1	Toronto FC	Cincinnati, Ohio
7:00 PM	Echenique (yellow card) 15'; Hagglund (yellow card) 81'	Report	Kuscevic (yellow card) 25'; Cifuentes (yellow card) 73'; Sallói 86'	Stadium: TQL Stadium; Attendance: 25,513; Referee: Alexis Da Silva

March 14 4	Toronto FC	1–1	New York Red Bulls	Toronto, Ontario
1:00 PM	Cifuentes (yellow card) 38'; Sallói 43'	Report	Dos Santos (yellow card) 22'; Voloder (yellow card) 32'; Choupo-Moting 90+8'	Stadium: BMO Field; Attendance: 18,767; Referee: Chris Penso

March 21 5	Toronto FC	2–1	Columbus Crew	Toronto, Ontario
1:00 PM	Cifuentes 56'; Zimmerman 83', (yellow card) 87'	Report	Abou Ali 4'; Herrera (yellow card) 7'; Chambost (yellow card) 45'; Thiaré (yellow card) 90+8'	Stadium: BMO Field; Attendance: 15,384; Referee: Pierre-Luc Lauzière

April 4 6	Toronto FC	3–2	Colorado Rapids	Toronto, Ontario
1:00 PM	Zimmerman (yellow card) 41'; Edwards (red card) 49'; Laryea 65', (yellow card) 86'; Monlouis (yellow card) 69'; Steffen 77' (o.g.); Sargent 85'	Report	Travis (red card) 34'; Aaronson 51'; Rosenberry 54'; M. Navarro (yellow card) 64' (yellow-red card) 74'; Atencio (yellow card) 73'; Cobb (yellow card) 89'; Ojediran (yellow card) 90+2'	Stadium: BMO Field; Attendance: 14,442; Referee: Ricardo Montero

April 11 7	Toronto FC	1–1	FC Cincinnati	Toronto, Ontario
1:00 PM	Kuscevic (yellow card) 38'; Osorio (yellow card) 45+4'; Flores 83' (o.g.)	Report	Ramírez (yellow card) 58'; Denkey (yellow card) 70' (yellow-red card) 71'; Mboma Dem 90+2'	Stadium: BMO Field; Attendance: 15,770; Referee: Ricardo Fierro

April 18 8	Toronto FC	3–3	Austin FC	Toronto, Ontario
1:00 PM	Edwards (yellow card) 43'; Sallói 52'; Cifuentes (yellow card) 53'; Laryea 67'; Stefanović (yellow card) 79'; Franklin 88'; Coello (yellow card) 89'; Aristizábal (yellow card) 90+10'	Report	Dubersarsky (yellow card) 11'; Bell 29'; Biro (yellow card) 45+2'; Torres 78'; Ramirez 82'	Stadium: BMO Field; Attendance: 16,550; Referee: Drew Fischer

April 22 9	Toronto FC	3–3	Philadelphia Union	Toronto, Ontario
7:30 PM	Osorio (yellow card) 7'; Sallói (yellow card) 16'; Coello (yellow card) 46'; Laryea (yellow card) 49'; Sargent 56'; Franklin 64'; Gavran 90+6'	Report	Iloski 45+4'; Jean Jacques 52', (yellow card) 65'; Sery Larsen (yellow card) 61'; Makhanya (yellow card) 78'; Harriel 89'; Bedoya (yellow card) 90+3'	Stadium: BMO Field; Attendance: 15,461; Referee: Fotis Bazakos

April 25 10	Toronto FC	1–2	Atlanta United FC	Toronto, Ontario
1:00 PM	Aristizábal 71'	Report	Gregersen (yellow card) 38'; Sanchez (yellow card) 45+2'; Miranchuk 48'; Muyumba 67'	Stadium: BMO Field; Attendance: 13,754; Referee: Ismail Elfath

May 2 11	Toronto FC	1–1	San Jose Earthquakes	Toronto, Ontario
1:00 PM	Sallói 2'; Osorio (yellow card) 75'; Coello (yellow card) 90+1'	Report	Judd 13'; Leroux (yellow card) 17'; Vieira (yellow card) 36'	Stadium: BMO Field; Attendance: 19,021; Referee: Michael Venne

May 9 12	Toronto FC	2–4	Inter Miami CF	Toronto, Ontario
1:00 PM	Edwards (yellow card) 51'; Aristizábal 82', 90'	Report	De Paul 44'; Suárez 56', (yellow card) 61'; Reguilón 73'; Messi 75'; Pintér (yellow card) 89'	Stadium: BMO Field; Attendance: 44,828; Referee: Victor Rivas

May 16 13	Charlotte FC	3–1	Toronto FC	Charlotte, North Carolina
7:30 PM	Zaha 19'; Schnegg 35'; Biel (yellow card) 50', (goal) 84' (pen.); Westwood (yellow card) 90+2'	Report	Etienne 22'; Henry (yellow card) 54'; Osorio (yellow card) 84'	Stadium: Bank of America Stadium; Attendance: 28,158; Referee: Allen Chapman

May 23 14	Chicago Fire FC	2–1	Toronto FC	Chicago, Illinois
8:30 PM	Lod 22'; Cuypers (yellow card) 40'; Gutman (yellow card) 60', (goal) 65'; Salétros (yellow card) 87'; Brady (yellow card) 90+1'	Report	Henry (yellow card) 14'; Sargent 34'; Zimmerman (yellow card) 79'; Corbeanu (yellow card) 90+1'; Osorio (yellow card) 90+1'	Stadium: Soldier Field; Attendance: 26,752; Referee: Sergii Demianchuk

July 16 15	CF Montréal	0–0	Toronto FC	Montreal, Quebec
7:30 PM	Pereira (yellow card) 64'	Report	Sallói (yellow card) 69'	Stadium: Saputo Stadium; Attendance: 17,707; Referee: Guido Gonzales Jr.

July 22 16	New England Revolution	0–0	Toronto FC	Foxborough, Massachusetts
7:30 PM	Polster (yellow card) 56'; Raines (yellow card) 90+3'	Report		Stadium: Gillette Stadium; Attendance: 17,249; Referee: Sergii Demianchuk

July 25 17	D.C. United	2–1	Toronto FC	Washington, D.C.
7:30 PM	Franklin 41' (o.g.); Munteanu (yellow card) 53'; Baribo 90+10' (pen.)	Report	Corbeanu 76'; Osorio (yellow card) 88'	Stadium: Audi Field; Attendance: 19,250; Referee: Serhiy Boyko

July 31 18	New York City FC	1–1	Toronto FC	New York City, New York
7:30 PM	Fernández 9' (pen.), (yellow card) 18'; Talles Magno (yellow card) 11'	Report	Laryea (yellow card) 7'; Osorio (yellow card) 45+6'; Mihailovic 45+7'; Dorsch (yellow card) 56'; Gilman (yellow card) 61'	Stadium: Yankee Stadium; Attendance: 21,085; Referee: Ramy Touchan

August 15 19	Toronto FC	2–1	New England Revolution	Toronto, Ontario
7:30 PM	Sands 43' (o.g.); Dorsch 45+6'; Zimmerman (yellow card) 74'; Mihailovic (red card) 76'	Report	Raines (yellow card) 25'; Harris 90'	Stadium: BMO Field; Attendance: 21,402; Referee: Joe Dickerson

August 19 20	Toronto FC	3–3	Charlotte FC	Toronto, Ontario
7:30 PM	Cimermancic 14'; Zimmerman (red card) 56'; Sallói 77'; Pereira (yellow card) 85'; Dorsch 90'	Report	Aloko 8'; Toklomati 20'; Kessler 58'	Stadium: BMO Field; Attendance: 19,909; Referee: Alexis Da Silva

August 22 21	Inter Miami CF	1–2	Toronto FC	Miami, Florida
7:30 PM	Falcón (yellow card) 53'; Messi 82'; Ayala (yellow card) 90+5'	Report	Laryea (yellow card) 37'; Sargent 59'; Etienne 62'	Stadium: Nu Stadium; Attendance: 26,654; Referee: Ismail Elfath

August 29 22	Toronto FC	1–1	New York City FC	Toronto, Ontario
7:30 PM	Kuscevic (yellow card) 18'; Mihailovic (yellow card) 59'; Pereira (yellow card) 64'; Sallói 70'	Report	Fernández 29', (yellow card) 40'; Perea (yellow card) 54'; Shore (yellow card) 90+1'	Stadium: BMO Field; Attendance: 23,174; Referee: Malik Badawi

September 5 23	Toronto FC	4–4	Chicago Fire FC	Toronto, Ontario
7:30 PM	Sargent 27', 38', 54'; Cimermancic (yellow card) 34'; Kuscevic (yellow card) 90'; Etienne 90+2'	Report	Haile-Selassie 13', 58'; Rogers (yellow card) 18'; Zimmerman 49' (o.g.); Lewandowski 63'; Lod (yellow card) 86'	Stadium: BMO Field; Attendance: 26,693; Referee: Tori Penso

September 9 24	Toronto FC	2–1	Nashville SC	Toronto, Ontario
7:30 PM	Sallói 72'; Aristizábal 90+3'; Gavran (yellow card) 90+7'	Report	Dorsch 4' (o.g.)	Stadium: BMO Field; Attendance: 13,769; Referee: Filip Dujic

September 12 25	Orlando City SC	3–0	Toronto FC	Orlando, Florida
7:30 PM	Otávio (yellow card) 20'; Gerbet (yellow card) 27'; Griezmann 45+1'; Sarajian 82'; Iago (yellow card) 90+1'; Angulo 90+6'	Report	Etienne (yellow card) 54'; Coello (yellow card) 60'	Stadium: Inter.co Stadium; Attendance: 19,617; Referee: Jon Freemon

September 19 26	St. Louis City SC	3–1	Toronto FC	St. Louis, Missouri
8:30 PM	Wallem (yellow card) 28'; Holse 41'; Totland 54'; Becher 68'; Fall (yellow card) 72'	Report	Zimmerman (yellow card) 23'; Coello (yellow card) 74'; Corbeanu 90+7'	Stadium: Energizer Park; Attendance: 22,423; Referee: Lukasz Szpala

September 26 27	Nashville SC	2–0	Toronto FC	Nashville, Tennessee
8:30 PM	Mukhtar 16', 43'; Surridge (yellow card) 81'	Report		Stadium: Geodis Park; Attendance: 26,720; Referee: Ramy Touchan

October 10 28	Toronto FC	2–1	CF Montréal	Toronto, Ontario
1:00 PM	Morgan 90+3'; Mihailovic 90+5'; Laryea (yellow card) 90+5'; Osorio (yellow card) 90+7'	Report	Ríos 52'; Vera (yellow card) 55'; Craig (yellow card) 84'; Petrasso (yellow card) 87'	Stadium: BMO Field; Attendance: 21,572; Referee: Allen Chapman

October 14 29	Toronto FC	3–3	Orlando City SC	Toronto, Ontario
7:30 PM	Morgan 27'; Corbeanu 49'; Coello (yellow card) 66'; Kuscevic (yellow card) 76'; Pereira 90'; Laryea (yellow card) 90+5'	Report	Ojeda 45+1' (pen.); Griezmann 77'; Nogueira (yellow card) 82'; Dike 83'	Stadium: BMO Field; Attendance: 17,303; Referee: Armando Villarreal

October 17 30	New York Red Bulls	0–2	Toronto FC	Harrison, New Jersey
7:30 PM		Report	Che 3' (o.g.); Monlouis (yellow card) 52'; Morgan (yellow card) 67'; Sallói 82'; Etienne (yellow card) 87'	Stadium: Sports Illustrated Stadium; Attendance: 17,922; Referee: Marcos de Oliveira

October 24 31	Columbus Crew	4–2	Toronto FC	Columbus, Ohio
2:30 PM	Tapia 16'; Amundsen 21', 48'; Bangoura (yellow card) 31' (yellow-red card) 70'; Lennon 59'	Report	Sallói 69'; Sargent 81'	Stadium: ScottsMiracle-Gro Field; Attendance: 19,487; Referee: Chris Penso

October 28 32	Toronto FC	2–1	D.C. United	Toronto, Ontario
7:30 PM	Dorsch (yellow card) 33'; Sallói (yellow card) 49'; Osorio 64'; Pereira (yellow card) 84'; Sargent 86'	Report	Dozzell 29'; Rowles (yellow card) 50'; Nono (yellow card) 58'; Stroud (yellow card) 60'	Stadium: BMO Field; Attendance: 16,845; Referee: Alexis Da Silva

November 1 33	Atlanta United FC	3–1	Toronto FC	Atlanta, Georgia
4:30 PM	Almirón 22'; Sanchez 40'; Miranchuk 51'	Report	Sallói (yellow card) 33'; Morgan 79'; Coello (yellow card) 90+2'	Stadium: Mercedes-Benz Stadium; Attendance: 41,197; Referee: Filip Dujic

November 7 34	Philadelphia Union	4–1	Toronto FC	Chester, Pennsylvania
4:00 PM	C. Sullivan 28', 56'; Q. Sullivan 41' (pen.); Lukić (yellow card) 45'; Damiani 73' (pen.); Bender (yellow card) 87'	Report	Sargent 45+7'; Osorio (yellow card) 67'; Aristizábal (yellow card) 90+3'	Stadium: Subaru Park; Attendance: 19,145; Referee: Tim Ford

=== Canadian Championship ===
Toronto FC were drawn against Atlético Ottawa at home in the preliminary round on February 5, 2026.

May 5 Preliminary round	Toronto FC	1–3	Atlético Ottawa	Toronto, Ontario
7:30 PM	Kerr 16'; Etienne (yellow card) 68'; Coello (yellow card) 90+5'	Report	Aguilar (yellow card) 40'; García (yellow card) 54'; Antinoro (yellow card) 56'; Tabla 71', 81', 90+6' (pen.)	Stadium: BMO Field; Attendance: 11,627; Referee: Scott Bowman

=== Competitions summary ===
Competition	Record								First Match	Last Match	Final Position
Competition	G	W	D	L	GF	GA	GD	Win %	First Match	Last Match	Final Position
MLS Regular Season	34	9	12	13	52	67	−15	26.47	February 22	November 7	12th in Eastern Conference, 24th Overall
Canadian Championship	1	0	0	1	1	3	−2	0.00	May 5		Preliminary round
Total	35	9	12	14	53	70	−17	25.71			

Source: Competitions
