= Gabriel Mikina =

Canadian soccer player

Personal information
- Full name: Gabriel Noah Mikina
- Date of birth: May 5, 2001 (age 25)
- Place of birth: Toronto, Ontario, Canada
- Height: 6 ft 2 in (1.88 m)
- Positions: Defender; midfielder

Team information
- Current team: Toronto FC II
- Number: 89

Youth career
- 2019: Rakow Czestochowa
- 2019: Stal Rzeszów

College career
Years	Team	Apps	(Gls)
2020–2022	Niagara Purple Eagles	42	(12)
2023	Syracuse Orange	21	(5)

Senior career*
Years	Team	Apps	(Gls)
2021–2023	North Toronto Nitros	31	(8)
2024–2025	St. Louis City SC 2	49	(3)
2026	SC Toulon	4	(0)
2026–	Toronto FC II	7	(0)
- * Club domestic league appearances and goals as of September 20, 2026

Gabriel Noah Mikina (born May 5, 2001) is a Canadian soccer player who plays for Toronto FC II in MLS Next Pro.

== Early life ==
Mikina is of Polish descent. In 2019, he played with the youth teams of Rakow Czestochowa and Stal Rzeszów.

== College career ==
In 2020, Mikina began attending Niagara University, where he played for the men's soccer team. On March 28, 2021, he scored his first collegiate goal in a victory over the Canisius Golden Griffins. In 2021, he was named to the MAAC All-Academic Team. After playing as a midfielder in his first to seasons, he transitioned to centre-back for the 2022 season. In his junior season in 2022, he was twice named the MAAC Offensive Player of the Week in October, and was once again named to the All-Academic Team.

In 2023, he transferred to Syracuse University to play for the men's soccer team for his senior season. At the end of the season, he was named to the All-ACC Academic Team, Academic All-District Team, and the Academic All-America Third Team.

== Club career ==
From 2021 to 2023, Mikina played with the North Toronto Nitros in League1 Ontario. At North Toronto, he transitioned from a midfielder to a centre-back.

In February 2024, Mikina signed a professional contract with St. Louis City 2 in MLS Next Pro. At the end of the 2025 season, he was named to the MLS Next Pro Best XI.

In February 2026, Mikina signed with French fourth tier side Toulon.

In August 2026, he signed with Toronto FC II in MLS Next Pro. He made his debut on August 14, against Chattanooga FC.

== Career statistics ==
As of September 20, 2026

Club	Season	League			Playoffs		Domestic Cup		Continental		Total	
Club	Season	Division	Apps	Goals	Apps	Goals	Apps	Goals	Apps	Goals	Apps	Goals
North Toronto Nitros	2021	League1 Ontario	2	0	—		—		—		2	0
North Toronto Nitros	2022	League1 Ontario	16	4	0	0	—		—		16	4
North Toronto Nitros	2023	League1 Ontario	13	4	—		—		—		13	4
North Toronto Nitros	Total		31	8	0	0	0	0	0	0	31	8
St. Louis City SC 2	2024	MLS Next Pro	22	0	3	1	—		—		25	1
St. Louis City SC 2	2025	MLS Next Pro	27	3	2	0	—		—		29	3
St. Louis City SC 2	Total		49	3	5	1	0	0	0	0	54	4
Toulon	2025–26	Championnat National 2	4	0	—		—		—		4	0
Toronto FC II	2026	MLS Next Pro	7	0	—		—		—		7	0
Career total			91	11	5	1	0	0	0	0	96	12
