= Lucas Dawson =

Lucas Dawson may refer to:

- Lucas Dawson (English footballer) (born 1993), an English footballer
- Lucas Dawson (Canadian soccer) (born 2011), a Canadian soccer player
