= Lucas Dawson (Canadian soccer) =

Canadian soccer player (born 2011)

Personal information
- Date of birth: July 4, 2011 (age 15)
- Place of birth: Hamilton, Ontario, Canada
- Position: Midfielder

Team information
- Current team: Toronto FC II
- Number: 87

Youth career
- Hamilton United
- 2024–: Toronto FC

Senior career*
Years	Team	Apps	(Gls)
2026–	Toronto FC II	15	(1)

International career^{‡}
2026–	Canada U15	2	(2)
- * Club domestic league appearances and goals as of September 20, 2026 ‡ National team caps and goals as of August 23, 2026

Lucas Dawson (born July 4, 2011) is a Canadian soccer player who plays for Toronto FC II in MLS Next Pro. He is the youngest player to ever appear in a match and also the youngest goal-scorer for Toronto FC II.

== Early life ==
Dawson played youth soccer with Hamilton United, before joining the Toronto FC Academy in October 2024.

== Club career ==
On May 8, 2026, Dawson made his professional debut for Toronto FC II in MLS Next Pro, as an academy call-up, against Red Bull New York II. He became the youngest player to make an appearance for the club at the age of 14 years, 10 months and four days. He started his first match on June 28, 2026, also recording his first assist, in a match against New England Revolution II. On July 17, 2026, he scored his first professional goal, in a 3-1 victory over FC Cincinnati 2, becoming the club's youngest ever goalscorer at the age of 15 years, 1 month and 13 days.

== International career ==
In August 2026, Dawson was named to the Canada U15 team for a pair of friendlies against Chile. In the first match, he scored in a 1-1 draw.

== Career statistics ==
As of September 20, 2026

Club	Season	League			Playoffs		Domestic Cup		Continental		Total	
Club	Season	Division	Apps	Goals	Apps	Goals	Apps	Goals	Apps	Goals	Apps	Goals
Toronto FC II	2026	MLS Next Pro	15	1	—		—		—		15	1
Career total			15	1	0	0	0	0	0	0	15	1
