= Marko Stojadinovic =

Canadian soccer player (born 2004)

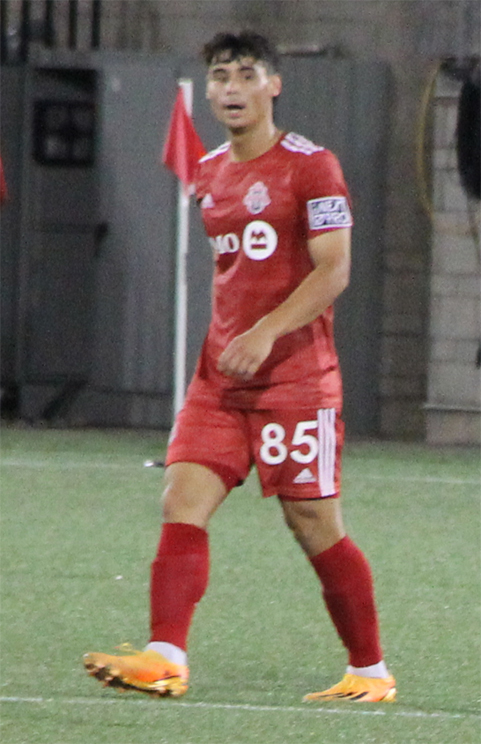
- Stojadinovic in 2023

Personal information
- Full name: Marko Nikolas Stojadinovic
- Date of birth: May 3, 2004 (age 22)
- Place of birth: Brampton, Ontario, Canada
- Height: 5 ft 11 in (1.80 m)
- Position: Defender

Team information
- Current team: Toronto FC II
- Number: 58

Youth career
- South Caledon SC
- Brampton YSC
- Woodbridge Strikers
- 2015–2021: Toronto FC
- 2021–2022: SC Borussia Lindenthal-Hohenlind
- 2022: SC Verl
- 2022–2023: Toronto FC

Senior career*
Years	Team	Apps	(Gls)
2023–2025	Toronto FC II	67	(3)
2026	Atlético Ottawa	5	(0)
2026–	Toronto FC II	16	(0)

International career^{‡}
2019	Canada U15	5	(0)
- * Club domestic league appearances and goals as of September 20, 2026 ‡ National team caps and goals as of August 10, 2019

Marko Nikolas Stojadinovic (born May 3, 2004) is a Canadian soccer player who plays for Toronto FC II in MLS Next Pro.

== Early life ==
Stojadinovic began playing youth soccer at age three with South Caledon SC. He later played youth soccer with Brampton Youth SC and the Woodbridge Strikers, before joining the Toronto FC Academy in February 2015. In 2021, he joined the U19 side of German club SC Borussia Lindenthal-Hohenlind. In 2022, he briefly joined the U19 side of German club SC Verl, before later returning to Toronto FC.

== Club career ==
On March 27, 2023, Stojadinovic made his professional debut with Toronto FC II in MLS Next Pro as an academy call-up in a match against FC Cincinnati 2. In August 2024, he signed a professional contract with Toronto FC II. On October 6, 2024, he scored his first goal in a 4–1 win over Crown Legacy FC.

In December 2025, he signed a two-year contract, with an option for 2028, with Atlético Ottawa in the Canadian Premier League. On May 20, 2026, he agreed to a mutual termination of his contract, after making only five substitute appearances, across all competitions.

On May 21, 2026, he returned to Toronto FC II on a new contract. He immediately re-joined the line-up, starting the match on May 24 against Columbus Crew 2.

== International career ==
Stojadinovic was born in Canada to a Serbian father and a Filipino mother.

In July 2019, Stojadinovic was called up to a camp with the Canada U15 for the first time. The following month, he was named to the roster for the 2019 CONCACAF Boys' Under-15 Championship.

== Career statistics ==
As of September 20, 2026

Club	Season	League			Playoffs		Domestic Cup		Continental		Total	
Club	Season	Division	Apps	Goals	Apps	Goals	Apps	Goals	Apps	Goals	Apps	Goals
Toronto FC II	2023	MLS Next Pro	16	0	—		—		—		16	0
Toronto FC II	2025	MLS Next Pro	25	1	—		—		—		25	1
Toronto FC II	2025	MLS Next Pro	26	2	—		—		—		26	2
Toronto FC II	Total		67	3	0	0	0	0	0	0	67	3
Atlético Ottawa	2026	Canadian Premier League	3	0	0	0	1	0	1	0	5	0
Toronto FC II	2026	MLS Next Pro	16	0	—		—		—		16	0
Career total			86	3	0	0	1	0	1	0	88	3
