= Antone Bossenberry =

Canadian soccer player (born 2008)

Personal information
- Full name: Antone Jason Bossenberry Romero
- Date of birth: August 14, 2008 (age 18)
- Place of birth: Kitchener, Ontario, Canada
- Height: 1.76 m (5 ft 9 in)
- Position: Midfielder

Team information
- Current team: Toronto FC
- Number: 56

Youth career
- 2019–2022: Inter Miami CF
- 2022–2024: Toronto FC

Senior career*
Years	Team	Apps	(Gls)
2025–2026	Toronto FC II	33	(4)
2026	→ Toronto FC (loan)	2	(0)
2026–	Toronto FC	0	(0)

International career^{‡}
2025	Canada U17	4	(0)
2026–	Canada U20	5	(1)
- * Club domestic league appearances and goals as of August 25, 2026 ‡ National team caps and goals as of August 8, 2026

Antone Jason Bossenberry Romero (born August 14, 2008) is a Canadian soccer player who plays as a midfielder for Major League Soccer club Toronto FC.

== Early life ==
Antone was born on 14 August 2008. Born in Canada, he is of Mexican ancestry through his mother. As a youth player, Antone joined the youth academy of Toronto FC.

== Club career ==
Ahead of the 2025 season, Bossenberry was promoted and signed to the club's reserve team. In April 2026, he joined the Toronto FC first team on a short-term loan. In October 2026, he officially signed a first-team contract with Toronto FC as a homegrown player through to the 2028–29 MLS season, with further club options to extend the deal to 2029–30 and 2030–31.

== International career ==
Antone is a Canada youth international. During February 2025, he played for the Canada men's national under-17 soccer team for 2025 CONCACAF U-17 World Cup qualification. Antone was also rostered for the 2025 FIFA U-17 World Cup in Doha, Qatar.

== Style of play ==
Antone plays as a midfielder. English newspaper The Guardian wrote in 2025 that he is "a complete attacking midfielder who uses his stature to his advantage, making explosive dashes with the ball. Besides this, he is an incredible and unpredictable dribbler, comfortable cutting inside to change the direction of play and use his vision".

== Career statistics ==
As of match played September 20, 2026

Appearances and goals by club, season and competition
Club	Season	League			Playoffs		National cup		Continental		Total	
Club	Season	Division	Apps	Goals	Apps	Goals	Apps	Goals	Apps	Goals	Apps	Goals
Toronto FC II	2025	MLS Next Pro	23	2	—		—		—		23	2
Toronto FC II	2026	MLS Next Pro	10	2	—		—		—		10	2
Toronto FC II	Total		33	4	0	0	0	0	0	0	33	4
Toronto FC (loan)	2026	Major League Soccer	2	0	0	0	1	0	—		3	0
Career total			35	4	0	0	1	0	0	0	36	4
