= Richard Chukwu =

Canadian soccer player (born 2008)

Personal information
- Full name: Mba Richard Mmah Chukwu
- Date of birth: February 25, 2008 (age 18)
- Place of birth: Bradford, Ontario, Canada
- Height: 1.83 m (6 ft 0 in)
- Position: Defender

Team information
- Current team: Toronto FC
- Number: 96

Youth career
- Bradford Eagles SC
- 2020–2026: Toronto FC

Senior career*
Years	Team	Apps	(Gls)
2024	Toronto FC III	1	(0)
2024–2026	Toronto FC II	36	(0)
2026	→ Toronto FC (loan)	0	(0)
2026–	Toronto FC	4	(0)

International career^{‡}
2023–2025	Canada U17	14	(1)
2024–	Canada U20	8	(0)
2026–	Canada	3	(0)
- * Club domestic league appearances and goals as of November 7, 2026 ‡ National team caps and goals as of November 16, 2026

Mba Richard Mmah Chukwu (born February 25, 2008) is a Canadian soccer player who plays for Toronto FC in Major League Soccer and the Canada national team.

== Early life ==
Chukwu began playing youth soccer at age three with Bradford Eagles SC. In January 2020, he joined the Toronto FC Academy.

== Club career ==
On June 30, 2024, Chukwu made his professional debut, as an academy call-up, with Toronto FC II in MLS Next Pro, in a match against Philadelphia Union 2. In March 2025, he went on a training stint with Austrian club Sturm Graz. In April 2026, he signed a professional contract with Toronto FC II. On April 11, 2026, he signed a short-term loan with the Toronto FC first team in Major League Soccer.

In July 2026, he signed a Homegrown Player contract with Toronto FC, through the 2029–30 MLS season, with a club option for 2030–31.

== International career ==
Born in Canada, Chukwu is of Nigerian descent. In July 2024, Chukwu was named to the Canada U20 team for the 2024 CONCACAF U-20 Championship. In October 2025, he was named to the Canada U17 for the 2025 FIFA U-17 World Cup.

In November 2024, he was called into a training camp with the Canada senior team. He debuted with Canada in a friendly 1–0 win over Chile on September 26, 2026.

== Career statistics ==
=== Club ===
As of match played November 7, 2026

Appearances and goals by club, season and competition
Club	Season	League			Playoffs		National cup		Other		Total	
Club	Season	Division	Apps	Goals	Apps	Goals	Apps	Goals	Apps	Goals	Apps	Goals
Toronto FC III	2024	League1 Ontario Championship	1	0	—		—		0	0	1	0
Toronto FC II	2024	MLS Next Pro	10	0	—		—		—		10	0
Toronto FC II	2025	MLS Next Pro	17	0	—		—		—		17	0
Toronto FC II	2026	MLS Next Pro	9	0	—		—		—		9	0
Toronto FC II	Total		36	0	0	0	0	0	0	0	36	0
Toronto FC	2026	Major League Soccer	4	0	—		0	0	—		4	0
Career total			41	0	0	0	0	0	0	0	41	0

=== International ===
As of match played November 16, 2026

Appearances and goals by national team and year
National team	Year	Apps	Goals
Canada	2026	3	0
Total		3	0
