= Daniel Stampatori =

Canadian soccer player (born 2004)

Personal information
- Date of birth: July 28, 2004 (age 22)
- Place of birth: Mississauga, Ontario, Canada
- Height: 5 ft 11 in (1.80 m)
- Position: Defender

Team information
- Current team: Toronto FC II

Youth career
- Sigma FC

College career
Years	Team	Apps	(Gls)
2022–2025	Lipscomb Bisons	53	(2)

Senior career*
Years	Team	Apps	(Gls)
2021	Sigma FC	8	(0)
2022	Forge FC	2	(0)
2022	→ Sigma FC (loan)	10	(0)
2023–2024	Sigma FC	16	(0)
2026–	Toronto FC II	13	(1)
- * Club domestic league appearances and goals as of September 20, 2026

Daniel Stampatori (born July 28, 2004) is a Canadian professional soccer player who plays for Toronto FC II in MLS Next Pro.

== College career ==
In June 2022, he committed to Lipscomb University to play for their men's soccer team beginning in the 2022-23 school year. On November 6, 2023, he scored his first collegiate goal in a victory over the Central Arkansas Bears. He was named to the Atlantic Sun Conference All-Tournament Team in 2023. In 2024, he was named to the ASUN All-Academic Team. In 2025, he was again named to the ASUN All-Academic Team, as well as being named an Academic All-District.

== Playing career ==
Stampatori played youth soccer with Sigma FC. In 2021, he began playing with Sigma's first team in League1 Ontario.

In April 2022, he signed a developmental contract with Forge FC of the Canadian Premier League, who are an affiliate club of Sigma. After appearing as an unused substitute in two 2022 CONCACAF Champions League matches against Cruz Azul, Stampatori made his professional debut on April 16 against Cavalry FC. He also continued to play with Sigma in League1 Ontario in 2022.

In February 2026, he signed with Toronto FC II in MLS Next Pro. On September 8, 2026, he scored his first professional goal for Toronto FC II, in a 4-2 victory over Columbus Crew 2.

== Career statistics ==
As of September 20, 2024

Appearances and goals by club, season and competition
Club	Season	League			Playoffs		National cup		Other		Total	
Club	Season	Division	Apps	Goals	Apps	Goals	Apps	Goals	Apps	Goals	Apps	Goals
Sigma FC	2023	League1 Ontario	8	0	—		—		—		8	0
Forge FC	2022	Canadian Premier League	2	0	0	0	0	0	—		2	0
Sigma FC (loan)	2022	League1 Ontario	10	0	—		—		—		10	0
Sigma FC	2023	League1 Ontario	10	0	—		—		—		10	0
Sigma FC	2024	League1 Ontario Premier	6	0	—		—		2	0	8	0
Sigma FC	Total		26	0	0	0	0	0	2	0	28	0
Toronto FC II	2026	MLS Next Pro	13	1	—		—		—		13	1
Career total			49	1	0	0	0	0	2	0	51	1
