= Stefan Kapor =

Canadian soccer player (born 2009)

Personal information
- Date of birth: April 4, 2009 (age 17)
- Place of birth: Stoney Creek, Ontario, Canada
- Height: 6 ft 3 in (1.91 m)
- Position: Defender

Team information
- Current team: Toronto FC
- Number: 98

Youth career
- Hamilton Serbians SC
- 2022–2024: Toronto FC

Senior career*
| Years | Team | Apps | (Gls) |
| 2024 | Toronto FC III | 4 | (2) |
| 2024–2025 | Toronto FC II | 14 | (0) |
| 2026– | Toronto FC | 0 | (0) |
| 2026– | → Toronto FC II (loan) | 16 | (0) |

International career^{‡}
| 2025 | Canada U16 | 3 | (0) |
| 2024– | Canada U17 | 11 | (0) |
- * Club domestic league appearances and goals as of September 20, 2026 ‡ National team caps and goals as of September 30, 2026

Stefan Kapor (born April 4, 2009) is a Canadian soccer player who plays for Toronto FC in Major League Soccer.

== Early life ==
Kapor began playing youth soccer with Hamilton Serbians SC at age three, before joining the Toronto FC Academy in August 2022.

== Club career ==
In 2024, Kapor began the season with Toronto FC III in the League1 Ontario Championship.

On September 11, 2024, Kapor made his professional debut with Toronto FC II in MLS Next Pro, as an Academy call-up, against New York City FC II. In February 2025, he signed a professional contract with the team.

In October 2025, he signed a Homegrown Player contract with the Toronto FC first team, effective January 1, 2026, through 2029, with an option for 2030, becoming the second-youngest player to ever sign with the club.

== International career ==
Kapor was named to the Canada U15 for the 2023 CONCACAF Boys' Under-15 Championship. In November 2024, he was called up to the Canada U17 for a series of friendlies in Costa Rica. He made his U17 debut on November 15, 2024, against Costa Rica U17. He was named as an alternate player for the roster for the 2025 CONCACAF U-17 World Cup qualification tournament in February 2025. In May 2025, he was called up to the Canada U16 team for a series of friendlies. In September 2025, he was called up for another set of friendlies with the U17s.

== Personal life ==
Kapor is the cousin of fellow professional soccer player Milovan Kapor.

== Career statistics ==
As of September 20, 2026

Appearances and goals by club, season and competition
| Club | Season | League | | | Playoffs | | National cup | | Other | | Total | |
| Club | Season | Division | Apps | Goals | Apps | Goals | Apps | Goals | Apps | Goals | Apps | Goals |
|---|---|---|---|---|---|---|---|---|---|---|---|---|
| Toronto FC III | 2024 | League1 Ontario Championship | 4 | 0 | – | | – | | 0 | 0 | 4 | 0 |
| Toronto FC II | 2024 | MLS Next Pro | 3 | 0 | – | | – | | – | | 3 | 0 |
| Toronto FC II | 2025 | MLS Next Pro | 11 | 0 | — | | – | | – | | 11 | 0 |
| Toronto FC II | Total | | 14 | 0 | 0 | 0 | 0 | 0 | 0 | 0 | 14 | 0 |
| Toronto FC II (loan) | 2026 | MLS Next Pro | 16 | 0 | – | | – | | – | | 16 | 0 |
| Career total | | | 34 | 0 | 0 | 0 | 0 | 0 | 0 | 0 | 34 | 0 |
