= Emilio Aristizábal =

Colombian footballer (born 2005)

Personal information
- Full name: Emilio Aristizábal Chavarriaga
- Date of birth: 5 August 2005 (age 21)
- Height: 1.87 m (6 ft 2 in)
- Position: Forward

Team information
- Current team: Toronto FC (on loan from Atlético Nacional)
- Number: 17

Youth career
- 2011–2019: Escuela Aristigol
- 2020–2023: Atlético Nacional

Senior career*
Years	Team	Apps	(Gls)
2023–	Atlético Nacional	13	(0)
2025	→ Fortaleza CEIF (loan)	34	(12)
2026–	→ Toronto FC (loan)	25	(4)

International career
2024–2025	Colombia U20	12	(1)
Medal record
Men's football
Representing Colombia
FIFA U-20 World Cup
Third place	2025 Chile
- * Club domestic league appearances and goals as of 7 November 2026

Emilio Aristizábal Chavarriaga (born 5 August 2005) is a Colombian professional footballer who plays as a forward for Major League Soccer club Toronto FC, on loan from Categoría Primera A club Atlético Nacional.

== Early life ==
Aristizábal is the son of former Colombian international footballer Víctor Aristizábal.

== Club career ==
Having started his footballing career in the academy run by his father, named Escuela Aristigol, at the age of five, Aristizábal was not initially eager to train, with his father stating that he would often be too tired from school. After settling, he would often train with players one or two years older than him, and began to attract the attention of professional side Atlético Nacional in 2019. Having undergone a two-month trial with the club in October and November 2019, he joined the club in January of the following year, undergoing pre-season with the club's youth team.

Having progressed through the academy, continuing to play with players one year his senior, he made his unofficial debut in a 1–0 friendly loss to Millonarios on 8 July 2023. On 2 November of the same year, he made his official debut for the club; coming on as a late second-half substitution for Jefferson Duque, as Atlético Nacional went on to beat Deportivo Pereira on penalties in their Copa Colombia match.

In January 2024, Aristizábal scored his first goal for Atlético Nacional; in the club's last pre-season friendly, he scored a goal from six yards after meeting Carlos Sierra's cross, as Atlético Nacional went on to draw 1–1 with Venezuelan opposition Caracas.

On 17 February 2026, Aristizábal joined Major League Soccer club Toronto FC on loan for the 2026 season, with an option to make the transfer permanent.

== Style of play ==
Initially a winger while at the Escuela Aristigol, he transitioned into a striker during his development, the same position as his father.

== Career statistics ==
As of match played 7 November 2026

Appearances and goals by club, season and competition
Club	Season	League			National cup		Continental		Other		Total	
Club	Season	Division	Apps	Goals	Apps	Goals	Apps	Goals	Apps	Goals	Apps	Goals
Atlético Nacional	2023	Categoría Primera A	1	0	2	0	0	0	—		3	0
Atlético Nacional	2024	Categoría Primera A	12	0	0	0	—		—		12	0
Atlético Nacional	Total		13	0	2	0	0	0	—		15	0
Fortaleza CEIF (loan)	2025	Categoría Primera A	34	12	2	0	—		—		36	12
Toronto FC (loan)	2026	Major League Soccer	25	4	1	0	—		—		26	4
Career total			72	16	5	0	0	0	0	0	77	16

== Honours ==
Colombia U20

- FIFA U-20 World Cup third place: 2025
