= Damar Dixon =

Canadian soccer player (born 2004)

Personal information
- Full name: Damar O'Neil Dixon
- Date of birth: May 3, 2004 (age 22)
- Place of birth: Scarborough, Ontario, Canada
- Position: Forward

Team information
- Current team: Toronto FC II (on loan from Frosinone)
- Number: 93

Youth career
- Toronto International YFC
- Unionville Milliken SC
- 2023–: Frosinone

Senior career*
Years	Team	Apps	(Gls)
2021	Unionville Milliken SC	2	(0)
2022–2023	ASD Cartigliano	22	(5)
2025–	Frosinone	0	(0)
2026–	→ Toronto FC II (loan)	21	(6)
- * Club domestic league appearances and goals as of September 20, 2026

Damar O'Neil Dixon (born May 3, 2004) is a Canadian professional soccer player who plays for MLS Next Pro club Toronto FC II, on loan from Serie A club Frosinone.

== Early life ==
Dixon holds dual Canadian and Jamaican citizenship.

Dixon played youth soccer with the Toronto International YFC and Unionville Milliken SC. In 2023, he joined the youth system of Italian club Frosinone.

== Club career ==
In 2021, Dixon played in League1 Ontario with Unionville Milliken SC.

In September 2022, he joined Serie D side ASD Cartigliano. On September 28, he made his debut against Este. On December 11, he scored a brace against Adriese.

In July 2023, he joined Serie A side Frosinone, where he will begin with the U19 side. In June 2025, he signed an extension through 2028. On September 23, 2025, he made his first team debut in a Coppa Italia match against Cagliari. In January 2026, he was loaned to Toronto FC II in MLS Next Pro through June 2026. On March 15, 2026, he scored his first goal in a 3-2 loss against Columbus Crew 2. His loan was later extended through the remainder of 2026.

== Career statistics ==
As of September 20, 2026

Club	Season	League			Domestic Cup		Continental		Other		Total	
Club	Season	Division	Apps	Goals	Apps	Goals	Apps	Goals	Apps	Goals	Apps	Goals
Unionville Milliken SC	2021	League1 Ontario	2	0	–		–		–		2	0
ASD Cartigliano	2022–23	Serie D	22	5	–		–		0	0	22	5
Frosinone	2025–26	Serie B	0	0	1	0	–		–		1	0
Toronto FC II (loan)	2026	MLS Next Pro	21	6	–		–		–		21	6
Career total			45	11	1	0	0	0	0	0	46	11
