= Dékwon Barrow =

Canadian soccer player (born 2004)

- Barrow in 2025

Personal information
- Date of birth: January 16, 2004 (age 22)
- Place of birth: Toronto, Ontario, Canada
- Height: 6 ft 1 in (1.85 m)
- Position: Forward

Team information
- Current team: Toronto FC II
- Number: 91

Youth career
- 2008–2015: York Jets SC
- Toronto FC
- North Toronto Nitros
- Athlete Institute FC
- 2022–2023: Toronto FC

Senior career*
Years	Team	Apps	(Gls)
2023–	Toronto FC II	49	(5)
2025	→ Toronto FC (loan)	0	(0)
- * Club domestic league appearances and goals as of September 20, 2026

Dékwon Barrow (born January 16, 2004) is a Canadian soccer player who plays for Toronto FC II in MLS Next Pro.

== Early life ==
Barrow played youth soccer with York Jets SC for seven years, before joining the Toronto FC Academy in January 2016. He later joined the North Toronto Nitros and Athlete Institute FC, before returning to the Toronto FC Academy in August 2022.

== Club career ==
Barrow began playing with Toronto FC II in MLS Next Pro as an academy player in 2023. He made his debut on April 23, 2023 against Philadelphia Union II and scored his first goal on July 21, 2023 against Inter Miami CF II. In March 2024, he signed a professional contract with Toronto FC II. On April 30, 2025, he signed a short-term loan agreement with the Toronto FC first team, making his first team debut the same day, starting their 2025 Canadian Championship match against CF Montréal. After the club did not initially pick up his option for 2026, in February 2026, he re-signed with Toronto FC II for the 2026 season, on a new contract.

== Career statistics ==
As of match played September 20, 2026

Appearances and goals by club, season and competition
Club	Season	League			Playoffs		National cup		Continental		Total	
Club	Season	Division	Apps	Goals	Apps	Goals	Apps	Goals	Apps	Goals	Apps	Goals
Toronto FC II	2023	MLS Next Pro	12	2	–		–		–		12	2
Toronto FC II	2024	MLS Next Pro	10	0	–		–		–		10	0
Toronto FC II	2025	MLS Next Pro	16	2	–		–		–		16	2
Toronto FC II	2026	MLS Next Pro	11	1	–		–		–		11	1
Toronto FC II	Total		49	5	0	0	0	0	0	0	49	5
Toronto FC (loan)	2025	Major League Soccer	0	0	–		1	0	–		1	0
Career total			49	5	0	0	1	0	0	0	50	5
