= 2020 Toronto FC II season =

Toronto FC II
2020 season
- Manager: Mike Muñoz
- USL League One: Withdrew

The 2020 Toronto FC II season was the sixth season in the club's history. Having previously competed in the USL, this would have been the club's second season in USL League One (USL1), the third tier of professional soccer in the United States. On July 8, 2020, the team announced they would not play in the 2020 USL1 season because of COVID-19 restrictions. They plan to return for the 2021 season.

== Roster ==
Note: Flags indicate national team as defined under FIFA eligibility rules; some limited exceptions apply. Players may hold more than one non-FIFA nationality. Squad correct as of September 2, 2020.

No.	Pos.	Nation	Player
72	DF	TRI	Jelani Peters
—	DF	ARG	Franco Ramos Mingo
—	DF	PAN	Jesus West
—	MF	CAN	Mehdi Essoussi
—	MF	CAN	Jordan Faria
—	MF	CAN	Luca Petrasso
—	MF	CAN	Ralph Priso
—	MF	CAN	Luke Singh
—	MF	GHA	Gideon Waja

USL Academy Contract.

=== Out on loan ===
Note: Flags indicate national team as defined under FIFA eligibility rules; some limited exceptions apply. Players may hold more than one non-FIFA nationality.

No.	Pos.	Nation	Player
40	GK	USA	Eric Klenofsky (at Tacoma Defiance)
43	MF	CHI	Adolfo Ovalle (at Forward Madison)
48	DF	CAN	Dante Campbell (at Valour FC)
49	DF	CAN	Robert Boskovic (at Cavalry FC)
50	MF	CAN	Matthew Srbely (at Thisted FC)
77	FW	CAN	Jordan Perruzza (at San Antonio FC)
—	DF	CAN	Nyal Higgins (at Nyköpings BIS)
—	DF	CAN	Terique Mohammed (at FC Edmonton)
