= Micah Chisholm =

Canadian soccer player (born 2004)

- Chisholm with Toronto FC II in 2025

Personal information
- Date of birth: November 19, 2004 (age 21)
- Place of birth: Markham, Ontario, Canada
- Height: 6 ft 2 in (1.88 m)
- Position: Defender

Team information
- Current team: Toronto FC II

Youth career
- Unionville Milliken SC

College career
Years	Team	Apps	(Gls)
2022	Laurier Golden Hawks	10	(1)

Senior career*
Years	Team	Apps	(Gls)
2021–2023	Unionville Milliken SC	8	(0)
2023–2024	Hannover 96 II	6	(0)
2025–	Toronto FC II	38	(1)
2026	→ Toronto FC (loan)	2	(0)
- * Club domestic league appearances and goals as of September 20, 2026

Micah Chisholm (born November 19, 2004) is a Canadian soccer player who plays for Toronto FC II in MLS Next Pro.

== Early life ==
In 2022, Chisholm began attending Wilfrid Laurier University, where he played for the men's soccer team.

== Club career ==
From 2021 to 2023, he played in League1 Ontario with Unionville Milliken SC.

In July 2023, he signed with German club Hannover 96 II in the Regionalliga Nord. He had previously trialed with the club earlier in the year. He made his professional debut against TSV Havelse on August 19, 2023.

In March 2025, he signed with Toronto FC II in MLS Next Pro. He made his debut on April 10, 2025 against Inter Miami CF II. He scored his first professional goal on June 12, 2025, in a 2-0 victory against Inter Miami CF II. In February 2026, he re-signed with the club for the 2026 season. In May 2026, he signed a short-term loan with the Toronto FC first team. He made his Major League Soccer debut on May 2, 2026, in a substitute appearance against the San Jose Earthquakes.

== Career statistics ==
As of match played September 20, 2026

Appearances and goals by club, season and competition
Club	Season	League			Playoffs		National cup		Continental		Total	
Club	Season	Division	Apps	Goals	Apps	Goals	Apps	Goals	Apps	Goals	Apps	Goals
Unionville Milliken SC	2021	League1 Ontario	1	0	–		–		–		1	0
Unionville Milliken SC	2022	League1 Ontario	2	0	–		–		–		2	0
Unionville Milliken SC	2023	League1 Ontario	5	0	–		–		–		5	0
Unionville Milliken SC	Total		8	0	0	0	0	0	0	0	8	0
Hannover 96 II	2023–24	Regionalliga Nord	6	0	–		–		–		6	0
Toronto FC II	2025	MLS Next Pro	20	1	–		–		–		20	1
Toronto FC II	2026	MLS Next Pro	18	0	–		–		–		18	0
Toronto FC II	Total		38	1	0	0	0	0	0	0	38	1
Toronto FC (loan)	2026	Major League Soccer	2	0	0	0	0	0	–		2	0
Career total			54	1	0	0	0	0	0	0	54	1
