= Elias Khodri =

French footballer (born 2004)

Personal information
- Date of birth: 3 August 2004 (age 22)
- Place of birth: Lyon, France
- Height: 1.88 m (6 ft 2 in)
- Position: Forward

Team information
- Current team: Toronto FC II
- Number: 84

Youth career
- Saint-Étienne
- –2019: Béziers
- 2019–2021: FC Lyon
- 2021–2022: AS Saint-Priest

College career
Years	Team	Apps	(Gls)
2022–2023	Northeastern Plainsmen	31	(11)
2024	Gardner–Webb Runnin' Bulldogs	20	(9)
2025	New Hampshire Wildcats	18	(7)

Senior career*
Years	Team	Apps	(Gls)
2025	Sarasota Paradise	12	(5)
2025	→ Long Island Rough Riders (loan)	0	(0)
2026–	Toronto FC II	24	(6)

International career
	Algeria U17	1	(0)
- * Club domestic league appearances and goals as of September 20, 2026

Elias Khodri (born 3 August 2004) is a French professional footballer who plays for Toronto FC II in MLS Next Pro.

== Early life ==
Khodri played youth football in his native France with AS Saint-Étienne, AS Béziers, FC Lyon, and AS Saint-Priest.

== College career ==
In 2022, Khodri began attending Northeastern Junior College in the United States, where he played for the men's soccer team. He played for two seasons, scoring 11 goals and adding 13 assists, earning First Team All-Region and Team MVP honours and serving as team captain in 2023.

In 2024, he began attending Gardner–Webb University, where he played for the men's soccer team. On August 22, 2024, he scored his first goal in the first game of the season against the Houston Christian Huskies. At the end of the first week of the season, he was named the Big South Conference Offensive Player of the Week. At the end of the season, he was named to the All-Big South First Team and the All-South Region Second Team.

In 2025, he transferred to the University of New Hampshire, where he played for the men's soccer team. On September 5, 2025, he scored his first goal, in a 1-1 draw with the UC Irvine Anteaters. In November 2025, he was named the America East Conference Offensive Player of the Week. At the end of the season, he was named to the All-America East First Team, the All-Northeast Region Second Team, and the America East Commissioner's Honor Roll.

== Playing career ==
In February 2025, he signed with the Sarasota Paradise in USL League Two. On March 20, 2025, he played with the Long Island Rough Riders in the 2025 U.S. Open Cup, scoring in the 3-2 loss to USL League One side Charlotte Independence.

In February 2026, he signed a professional contract with Toronto FC II in MLS Next Pro. On 28 February 2026, he made his debut in the season opener against Philadelphia Union II. On 19 March 2026, he recorded his first goal and his first assist, in a 5-0 victory over New York City FC II.

== International career ==
Khodri attended a pre-selection camp with the Algeria U17 team and made one appearance.

== Career statistics ==
As of 24 September 2026

Club	Season	League			Playoffs		Domestic Cup		Other		Total	
Club	Season	Division	Apps	Goals	Apps	Goals	Apps	Goals	Apps	Goals	Apps	Goals
Sarasota Paradise	2025	USL League Two	12	2	2	1	–		–		14	3
Long Island Rough Riders (loan)	2025	USL League Two	0	0	0	0	1	1	–		1	1
Toronto FC II	2026	MLS Next Pro	24	6	–		–		–		24	6
Career total			36	8	2	1	1	1	0	0	39	10
