= Luca Costabile =

Danish footballer (born 2002)

Personal information
- Full name: Luca Bregninge Costabile
- Date of birth: 10 July 2002 (age 24)
- Place of birth: Copenhagen, Denmark
- Height: 5 ft 11 in (1.80 m)
- Position: Defender

Team information
- Current team: Toronto FC II
- Number: 74

Youth career
- FC Helsingør

College career
Years	Team	Apps	(Gls)
2022–2025	Maryland Terrapins	74	(4)

Senior career*
Years	Team	Apps	(Gls)
2021–2022	Crema	22	(1)
2025	Vermont Green FC	6	(0)
2026–	Toronto FC II	19	(2)
2026	→ Toronto FC (loan)	0	(0)
- * Club domestic league appearances and goals as of September 20, 2026

Luca Bregninge Costabile (born 10 July 2002) is a Danish professional footballer who plays for Toronto FC II in MLS Next Pro.

== Early life ==
Costabile played with FC Helsingør at U19 level.

== College career ==
In 2022, Costabile moved to the United States to attend the University of Maryland, where he played for the men's soccer team. At the end of his first season, he was named to the Big Ten All-Freshman Team. On November 3, 2024, he scored his first collegiate goal, in a 2-1 loss to the Ohio State Buckeyes. At the end of his senior season in 2025, in which he served as team captain, he was named to the All-Big Ten First Team and earned Maryland's Big Ten Sportsmanship Award.

== Playing career ==
In September 2021, Costabile signed with Italian side Crema in Serie D.

In 2025, he played with Vermont Green FC in USL League Two.

In January 2026, he signed a professional contract with Toronto FC II in MLS Next Pro. On 28 February 2026, he made his debut in the season opener against Philadelphia Union II. In May 2026, he signed a short-term loan with the Toronto FC first team. On September 8, 2026, he scored his first professional goal for Toronto FC II, in a 4-2 victory over Columbus Crew 2.

== Career statistics ==
As of December 31, 2025

Club	Season	League			Playoffs		Domestic Cup		Other		Total	
Club	Season	Division	Apps	Goals	Apps	Goals	Apps	Goals	Apps	Goals	Apps	Goals
Crema	2021–22	Serie D	22	1	–		–		–		22	1
Vermont Green FC	2025	USL League Two	6	0	0	0	–		–		6	0
Toronto FC II	2026	MLS Next Pro	19	2	—		—		—		19	2
Career total			47	3	0	0	0	0	0	0	47	3
