= Reid Fisher =

American soccer player (born 2004)

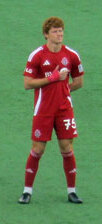
- Fisher with Toronto FC II in 2025

Personal information
- Date of birth: May 26, 2004 (age 22)
- Place of birth: Newport Beach, California, United States
- Height: 6 ft 3 in (1.91 m)
- Position: Defender

Team information
- Current team: Toronto FC II
- Number: 75

Youth career
- Slammers FC

College career
| Years | Team | Apps | (Gls) |
| 2023–2024 | San Diego State Aztecs | 35 | (2) |

Senior career*
| Years | Team | Apps | (Gls) |
| 2024 | Vermont Green FC | 11 | (0) |
| 2025– | Toronto FC II | 49 | (2) |
| 2025–2026 | → Toronto FC (loan) | 1 | (0) |
- * Club domestic league appearances and goals as of September 20, 2026

Reid Robert Fisher (born May 26, 2004) is an American soccer player who plays for Toronto FC II in MLS Next Pro.

== Early life ==
Fisher played youth soccer with Slammers FC.

== College career ==
In 2022, Fisher began attending San Diego State University, where he played for the men's soccer team. He redshirted the 2022 season, debuting in 2023. On September 8, 2023, he scored his first collegiate goal in a 3-0 victory over the George Washington Revolutionaries. At the end of the 2023 season, he was named the Pac-12 Conference Freshman of the Year, and was named to the College Soccer News All-Freshmen First Team and an All-Pac 12 Honorable Mention. He was also named to the Pac 12 Academic Honor Roll. In addition, he was named the San Diego State University Male Newcomer of the Year.

Ahead of the 2024 season, he was named the Western Athletic Conference Preseason Defensive Player of the Year. At the end of the season, he was named to the All-WAC First Team and the All-Far West Region First Team. He also earned Academic All-WAC honors. In addition, he was also named the San Diego State University Make Scholar Athlete of the Year. After the season, he was invited to participate in the MLS College Showcase.

== Club career ==
In 2024, Fisher played with USL League Two club Vermont Green FC.

At the 2025 MLS SuperDraft, Fisher was selected in the first round (23rd overall) by Toronto FC. In March 2025, he signed a contract with their second team, Toronto FC II, in MLS Next Pro. On March 8, 2025, he joined the first team on a short-term loan for their match that day. The next day, he made his professional debut with Toronto FC II on March 9 against FC Cincinnati 2. In July 2025, he signed another short-term loan with the first team. In April 2026, he signed another short-term loan. After signing another short-term loan, he made his first team debut on May 5, 2026 in a 2026 Canadian Championship match against Atlético Ottawa.

== Career statistics ==
As of match played September 20, 2026

Appearances and goals by club, season and competition
| Club | Season | League | | | Playoffs | | National cup | | Other | | Total | |
| Club | Season | Division | Apps | Goals | Apps | Goals | Apps | Goals | Apps | Goals | Apps | Goals |
|---|---|---|---|---|---|---|---|---|---|---|---|---|
| Vermont Green FC | 2024 | USL League Two | 11 | 0 | 3 | 0 | 0 | 0 | — | | 14 | 0 |
| Toronto FC II | 2025 | MLS Next Pro | 24 | 0 | — | | — | | — | | 24 | 0 |
| Toronto FC II | 2026 | MLS Next Pro | 25 | 2 | — | | — | | — | | 25 | 2 |
| Toronto FC II | Total | | 49 | 2 | 0 | 0 | — | | — | | 49 | 2 |
| Toronto FC (loan) | 2025 | Major League Soccer | 0 | 0 | — | | 0 | 0 | — | | 0 | 0 |
| Toronto FC (loan) | 2026 | Major League Soccer | 0 | 0 | 0 | 0 | 1 | 0 | — | | 1 | 0 |
| Toronto FC (loan) | Total | | 0 | 0 | 0 | 0 | 1 | 0 | — | | 1 | 0 |
| Career total | | | 60 | 2 | 3 | 0 | 1 | 0 | 0 | 0 | 64 | 2 |
