= Zakaria Nakhly =

Canadian soccer player (born 2005)

Personal information
- Date of birth: March 31, 2005 (age 21)
- Place of birth: Montréal, Québec, Canada
- Height: 6 ft 4 in (1.93 m)
- Position: Goalkeeper

Team information
- Current team: Toronto FC II

Youth career
- Mohammed VI Football Academy
- 2023–2024: Charleroi

Senior career*
Years	Team	Apps	(Gls)
2025	Ottawa South United	17	(0)
2026–	Toronto FC II	15	(0)
- * Club domestic league appearances and goals as of August 25, 2026

Zakaria Nakhly (born March 31, 2005) is a Canadian professional soccer player who plays as a goalkeeper with Toronto FC II in the MLS Next Pro.

== Early life ==
Nakhly played youth football in Morocco with Mohammed VI Football Academy for five years, before joining the youth system of Belgian club Charleroi in 2023.

== Club career ==
Ahead of the 2025 season, he attended pre-season with Atlético Ottawa of the Canadian Premier League as a trialist. Afterwards, he played with Ottawa South United in Ligue1 Québec in 2025.

Ahead of the 2026 season, he attended pre-season as a trialist with Major League Soccer club Toronto FC. In February 2026, he signed a contract with their second team, Toronto FC II, in MLS Next Pro. On February 28, 2026, he made his debut for the club in a 1-0 loss against Philadelphia Union 2. He recorded his first clean sheet in the next match on March 8 against New England Revolution II.
