= Abundance Salaou =

Ivorian footballer (born 2004)

Personal information
- Date of birth: 5 July 2004 (age 22)
- Place of birth: Abidjan, Ivory Coast
- Height: 1.83 m (6 ft 0 in)
- Position: Central midfielder

Team information
- Current team: Toronto FC II

Youth career
- Sangaré de Koumassi
- –2022: ASEC Mimosas

Senior career*
| Years | Team | Apps | (Gls) |
| 2022–2026 | IFK Göteborg | 19 | (0) |
| 2024 | → Utsiktens BK (loan) | 10 | (1) |
| 2025 | → Utsiktens BK (loan) | 19 | (1) |
| 2026– | Toronto FC II | 7 | (1) |
- * Club domestic league appearances and goals as of 20 September 2026

Abundance Salaou (born 5 July 2004) is an Ivorian footballer who plays as a central midfielder for Toronto FC II in MLS Next Pro.

== Early life ==
Salaou played youth football in his native Ivory Coast with Sangaré de Koumassi and ASEC Mimosas.

== Club career ==
In the summer of 2022, Salaou signed with Swedish Allsvenskan club IFK Göteborg. On 28 August 2022, he made his debut against IK Sirius. In August 2024, he was loaned to Utsiktens BK in the second-tier Superettan for the remainder of 2024. He made his debut for Utsiktens against Örebro SK on 27 August 27 2024, and scored his first professional goal against Helsingborgs IF on 4 October 2024. In March 2025, he was again loaned to Utsiktens BK for the remainder of 2025.

In February 2026, he signed with Toronto FC II in MLS Next Pro. He made his debut and scored his first goal for the club on 19 March 2026 against New York City FC II.
