= Gianni Cimini =

Canadian soccer coach (born 1983)

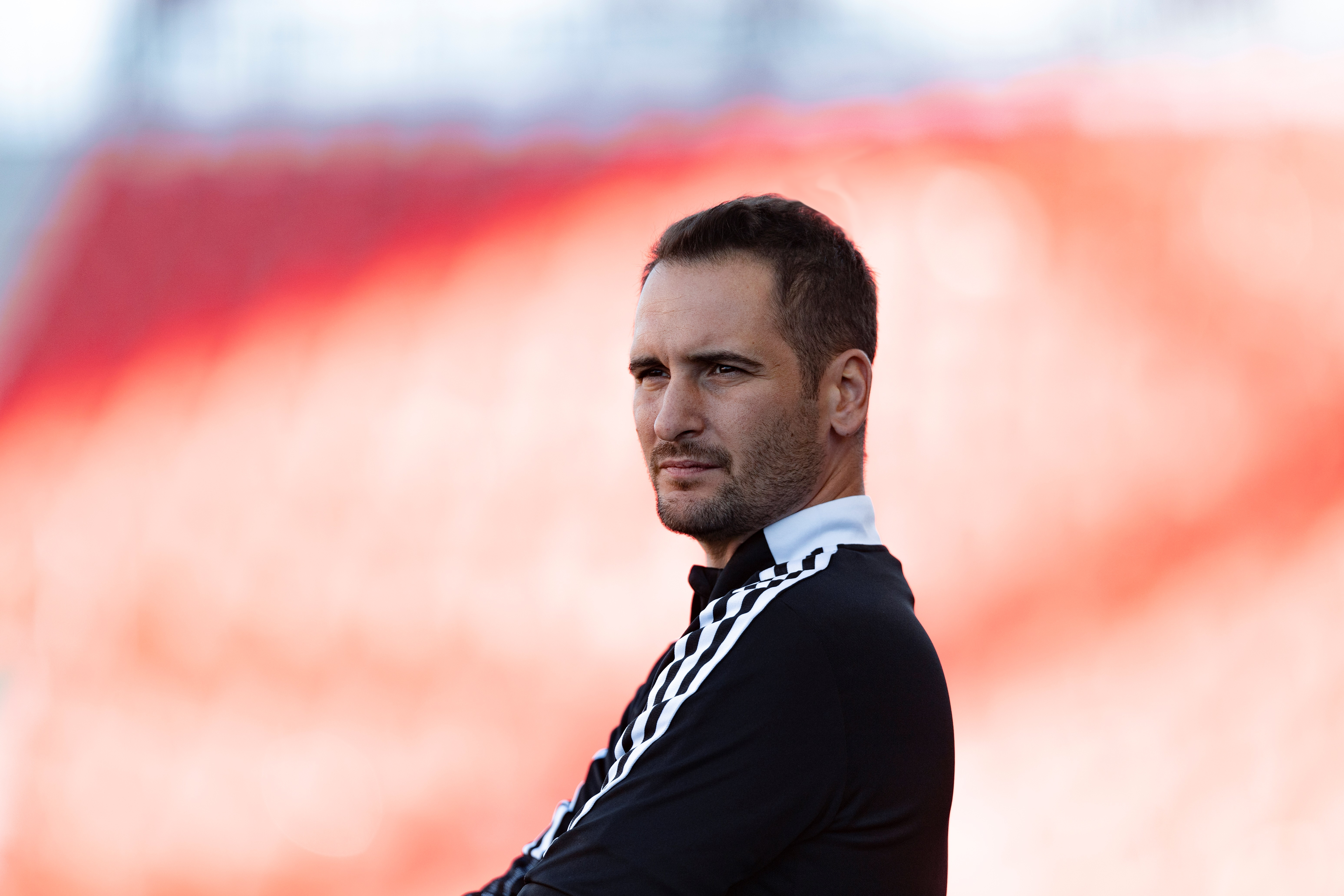
- Gianni Cimini with Toronto FC II in 2022

Personal information
- Full name: Gianni Cimini
- Date of birth: July 7, 1983 (age 43)
- Height: 5 ft 10 in (1.78 m)
- Position: Midfielder

Team information
- Current team: Toronto FC II (head coach)

Youth career
- Woodbridge Strikers

College career
| Years | Team | Apps | (Gls) |
| 2002–2003 | Old Dominion Monarchs | 36 | (2) |
| 2004–2005 | Philadelphia Rams | | |

International career
| 2001 | Canada U18 | | |

Managerial career
- 2022–: Toronto FC II

Gianni Cimini (born July 7, 1983) is a Canadian soccer coach, who serves as head coach of Toronto FC II in MLS Next Pro.

== Playing career ==
He played youth soccer with the Woodbridge Strikers and also played for the Team Ontario provincial team.

From 2002 to 2003, he attended Old Dominion University, playing for the men's soccer team. He scored his first goal on September 18, 2002 against the American Eagles.

In 2004, he played for Philadelphia University, where he earned Atlantic Soccer Conference First Team All-Conference awards in 2004 and 2005.

At international level, he played for the Canadian U17 and U18 teams. He played with the U18s at the Tournoi International Cadets de Rezé in 2001.

== Coaching career ==
From 2006 to 2012, he was the Technical Director for the Woodbridge Strikers youth soccer club, also serving as a Regional Assistant Coach with the Ontario Soccer Association in 2011.

In 2012, he joined the Toronto FC Academy, where he worked in various coaching positions between the U12 and U17 levels, as well as the as academy technical manager from 2015 to 2017. In 2020, he was listed as an honourable mention on Major League Soccer's list of academy coaches ready to make the jump to the first team. During this time, he also served as Aurora FC's Elite Player Pathway Manager and Director of Coach Education.

In 2022, he was named head coach of Toronto FC II in MLS Next Pro. In his first season as coach, he led the team to their first-ever playoff berth, after winning the Northeast Division. Under Cimini, the 2022 MLS NEXT Pro regular season marked the most successful campaign in TFC II history, which included the most wins (12), highest point total (41 points), most goals scored (44), highest goal differential (+6), most away wins (6) and a two-month unbeaten streak, marking the longest unbeaten run in club history (10 matches; seven wins and three draws between June 2 and August 21, 2022). After defeating Philadelphia Union 2 in the Conference semi-finals, they were defeated by Columbus Crew 2 in extra time in the Conference finals.

== Coaching statistics ==
As of September 20, 2026

Coaching record by team and tenure
| Team | Nat. | From | To | Record | | | | |
| Team | Nat. | From | To | G | W | D (Note: In MLS Next Pro, regular season draws are followed by shootouts to determine a winner. Shootout victories and losses are recorded as draws in this table.) | L | Win % |
|---|---|---|---|---|---|---|---|---|
| Toronto FC II | CAN | March 3, 2022 | Present | 166 | 60 | 34 | 72 | 36.14 |
| Total | | | | 166 | 60 | 34 | 72 | 36.14 |
