= Jahmarie Nolan =

Jamaican footballer (born 2009)

Personal information
- Full name: Jahmarie Justin Kasheem Nolan
- Date of birth: 11 November 2009 (age 17)
- Place of birth: Saint Catherine, Jamaica
- Height: 5 ft 10 in (1.78 m)
- Position: Striker

Team information
- Current team: Toronto FC II
- Number: 64

Youth career
- Mount Pleasant FA

Senior career*
Years	Team	Apps	(Gls)
2024–2025	Mount Pleasant FA	12	(1)
2025–	Toronto FC II	42	(11)
2026	→ Toronto FC (loan)	0	(0)

International career^{‡}
2025–2026	Jamaica U17	6	(7)
2026–	Jamaica U20	9	(9)
2026–	Jamaica	2	(0)
- * Club domestic league appearances and goals as of 20 September 2026 ‡ National team caps and goals as of 5 October 2026

Jahmarie Justin Kasheem Nolan (born 11 November 2009) is a Jamaican footballer who plays for MLS Next Pro club Toronto FC II and the Jamaica national team.

== Early life ==
Nolan played youth football in Jamaica with Mount Pleasant Football Academy for a period of five years.

== Club career ==
Nolan made his professional debut for Mount Pleasant FA in the Jamaica Premier League, at age 14, against Racing United FC on October 7, 2024. He scored his first goal for the club on 30 January, 2025 against Vere United. In his sole season with the team, he scored one goal and added four assists.

In March 2025, he signed with Toronto FC II in MLS Next Pro. He became the youngest player in team history to sign a professional contract with Toronto FC II. He made his debut on April 25 against Chicago Fire FC II. He scored his first goal on 9 May 2025, in a 2-1 loss to Chattanooga FC. In April 2026, he signed a short-term loan with the Toronto FC first team. After signing another short-term loan, he made his first team debut on May 5, 2026 in a 2026 Canadian Championship match against Atlético Ottawa. He led Toronto FC II in scoring in 2026, with ten goals and three assists.

== International career ==
In early 2025, Nolan played with the Jamaica U17 at the Torneo del Sol tournament in Mexico. Afterwards, he played at the 2025 CONCACAF U-17 World Cup qualification tournament, scoring his first goal in a 3–1 win over St. Lucia U17 on 10 February 2025, before scoring a brace and adding an assist in a 10–1 victory against the Cayman Islands U17 on February 12, 2025.

In February 2026, he won the Best Player Award at the 2026 CONCACAF U-17 World Cup qualification tournament, scoring four goals and adding two assist in three matches, helping them qualify for the 2026 FIFA U-17 World Cup. He then joined up with the Jamaica U20 for the 2026 CONCACAF U-20 Championship qualifying tournament, which occurred immediately afterwards.

In September 2026, he was called up to the Jamaica senior team for the first time, ahead of the 2026–27 CONCACAF Nations League A matches.

== Personal life ==
Nolan's mother is a resident of Canada. He was featured on The Guardian Next Generation 2026 60 best talents.

== Career statistics ==
=== Club ===
As of match played 14 September 2026

Appearances and goals by club, season and competition
Club	Season	League			National cup		Continental		Other		Total	
Club	Season	Division	Apps	Goals	Apps	Goals	Apps	Goals	Apps	Goals	Apps	Goals
Mount Pleasant FA	2024–25	Jamaica Premier League	12	1	—		—		—		12	1
Toronto FC II	2025	MLS Next Pro	19	1	—		—		—		19	1
Toronto FC II	2026	MLS Next Pro	23	10	—		—		—		23	10
Toronto FC II	Total		42	11	—		—		—		42	11
Toronto FC (loan)	2026	MLS	0	0	1	0	0	0	—		1	0
Career total			54	12	1	0	0	0	0	0	55	12

=== International ===
As of match played 5 October 2026

Appearances and goals by national team and year
National team	Year	Apps	Goals
Jamaica	2026	2	0
Total		2	0
