= Jackson Gilman =

American soccer player (born 2004)

- Gilman with Toronto FC II in 2026

Personal information
- Date of birth: April 29, 2004 (age 22)
- Place of birth: Schwenksville, Pennsylvania, United States
- Height: 5 ft 11 in (1.80 m)
- Position: Defender

Team information
- Current team: Toronto FC
- Number: 38

Youth career
- West-Mont United SA
- 2016–2022: Philadelphia Union

College career
Years	Team	Apps	(Gls)
2022–2025	Pittsburgh Panthers	75	(2)

Senior career*
Years	Team	Apps	(Gls)
2022	Philadelphia Union II	8	(0)
2023	Philadelphia Union UDS		
2024	West Chester United SC	5	(1)
2026	Toronto FC II	6	(0)
2026	→ Toronto FC (loan)	1	(0)
2026–	Toronto FC	13	(0)
- * Club domestic league appearances and goals as of November 7, 2026

Jackson Gilman (born April 29, 2004) is an American soccer player who plays for Toronto FC in Major League Soccer.

== Early life ==
Gilman first played youth soccer with West-Mont United SA. From 2016 to 2022, Gilman played with the Philadelphia Union Academy.

== College career ==
In 2022, Gilman began attending the University of Pittsburgh, where he played for the men's soccer team. In September 2022, he was named the ACC Co-Defensive Player of the Week. At the end of his first season he was named to the ACC All-Freshman Team, the College Soccer News First Team Freshman All-America, and the TopDrawerSoccer Freshman Best XI First Team, and the All-ACC Academic Team. Ahead of his sophomore season in 2023 season, he was named team captain. On September 9, 2023, he scored his first goal in a 3-0 victory over the Wake Forest Demon Deacons. At the end of the season he was named to the All-ACC Third team and the All-ACC Academic Team. In 2024, he was named to the All-ACC Third Team and the All-South Region Second Team. Over four seasons with the team from 2022 to 2025, he scored two goals and added seven assists in 75 appearances.

== Club career ==
In 2022, Gilman played with Philadelphia Union II in MLS Next Pro, making his debut on March 27, 2022, in the club's inaugural match against FC Cincinnati 2.

In 2023, he played with the Philadelphia Union Development Squad in the National Premier Soccer League. In 2024, he played with West Chester United SC in USL League Two.

At the 2026 MLS SuperDraft, Gilman was selected in the second round (36th overall) by Toronto FC. In February 2026, he signed a contract with the second team, Toronto FC II, in MLS Next Pro. In April 2026, he signed a pair of short term loans with the Toronto FC first team in Major League Soccer. After signing another short-term loan, he made his first team debut on May 5, 2026 in a 2026 Canadian Championship match against Atlético Ottawa. On May 16, after signing another short-term loan, he made his Major League Soccer debut, starting in a match against Charlotte FC, where he had a goal disallowed by VAR. On May 22, 2026, he signed a full MLS contract with the first team.
