= Fletcher Bank =

American soccer player (born 2003)

- Bank with Toronto FC II in 2026

Personal information
- Date of birth: May 1, 2003 (age 23)
- Place of birth: Bakersfield, California, United States
- Height: 5 ft 10 in (1.78 m)
- Position: Midfielder

Team information
- Current team: Toronto FC II
- Number: 79

Youth career
- Cal South ODP

College career
Years	Team	Apps	(Gls)
2022–2025	Stanford Cardinal	72	(10)

Senior career*
Years	Team	Apps	(Gls)
2024–2025	Ventura County Fusion	5	(2)
2026–	Toronto FC II	20	(4)
2026	→ Toronto FC (loan)	1	(0)
- * Club domestic league appearances and goals as of September 20, 2026

Fletcher Bank (born May 1, 2003) is an American soccer player who plays for Toronto FC II in MLS Next Pro.

== Early life ==
Bank played youth soccer with the Cal South ODP Program and attending Garces Memorial High School.

== College career ==
In 2022, Bank began attending Stanford University, where he played for the men's soccer team. He scored his first collegiate goal on August 28, 2022, against the SMU Mustangs. In 2023, he was named to the All-Pac 12 First Team and was named to the Academic All-District Team and Pac-12 Academic Honor Roll. In September 2024, he was named the Atlantic Coast Conference Co-Offensive Player of the Week. At the end of the season, he was named to the ACC All-Academic Team. At the end of his senior season in 2025, he was named to the All-ACC First Team, All-South Region Second Team, Academic All-America First Team, a Scholar All-American, Academic All-District, and the ACC All-Academic Team.

== Club career ==
At the 2024 MLS SuperDraft, Bank was selected in the third round (85th overall) by Toronto FC. However, he did not initially sign with the club, choosing to continue his education, while Toronto FC maintained his draft rights.

In 2024, he played with the Ventura County Fusion in USL League Two.

In February 2026, he signed a professional contract with Toronto FC II in MLS Next Pro. He made his professional debut on February 28, 2026, against Philadelphia Union II. On March 19, 2026, he scored two goals (including his first pro goal) and added three assists, in a 5–0 victory over New York City FC II, earning MLS Next Pro Player of the Matchweek honors. In May 2026, he signed a short-term loan with the Toronto FC first team. On May 16, after signing another short-term loan, he made his Major League Soccer debut, in a match against Charlotte FC.

== Personal life ==
He is the twin brother of Palmer Bank, who was drafted by the LA Galaxy.
