= Toronto FC Academy =

Canadian soccer team

- Full name: Toronto Football Club Academy
- Nickname: The Reds
- Founded: March 1, 2008; 18 years ago as TFC Academy
- Stadium: BMO Training Ground; 85 Carl Hall Road; Toronto, Ontario
- Coordinates: 43°44′37″N 79°28′18″W
- Academy director: Anthony Capotosto
- Head coach: U19: Dino Lopez; U17: Terry Dunfield
- League: MLS Next
- Website: torontofc.ca/academy
Home colours	Away colours

Toronto FC Academy, also known as TFC Academy, is the youth academy and development system of Canadian Major League Soccer club Toronto FC, which competes in MLS Next.

The academy has divisions from U14 to U19 and includes over 110 young players. The senior academy team is known as Toronto FC III.

== History ==
The TFC Academy's U-18 squad began playing in the Canadian Soccer League in 2008, with the U-16 squad competing in the CSL Reserve Division as TFC Academy II.

On August 26, 2010 Doneil Henry signed a pro contract with the Toronto FC senior squad becoming the first-ever TFC academy player to sign since the creation of the club in 2007. Three weeks following the Henry signing Toronto's first team signed forward Nicholas Lindsay becoming the second academy signing in history. In late September 2011, former defender Ashtone Morgan became the first graduate of the Toronto FC Academy to be called up to the Canadian men's national team. In 2011 there were close to 50 players enrolled in the TFC Academy.

On January 24, 2011, Stuart Neely the academy director announced that Toronto FC ownership approved a $17.6 million investment in a new training facility and planning was underway for the creation of a third academy team.

After the CSA de-sanctioned the CSL, TFC Academy withdrew from CSL prior to the 2013 season. The senior academy team joined the Ontario Soccer League for the 2013 season, however in 2014 the under-20 squad (known as Toronto FC III) began competing in League1 Ontario (L1O), which is the third level of the Canadian soccer pyramid. The academy also fielded a team in the Premier Development League in the 2015–16 seasons before withdrawing.

On June 27, 2013 Canada announced its 23-man squad for the upcoming 2013 CONCACAF Gold Cup, the squad included Ashtone Morgan and Doneil Henry which was the first time TFC academy graduates had made a senior international tournament roster.

In November 2014, Toronto FC announced the establishment of their own team to play in the minor professional USL Pro, which serves as a reserve team for TFC and a bridge between the Academy. Toronto FC became the sixth MLS club to own a USL Pro team. The team, which was named Toronto FC II, began play in 2015 at the Ontario Soccer Centre in Vaughan, just north of Toronto. The new facilities include a permanent seating area with room for expansion and a new artificial playing surface.

In September 2018, the U20 team left L1O and transformed into a U19 team that competes in the U.S. Soccer Development Academy (USSDA), along with U17 and U15 teams. The U16 and U14 teams will play in the Ontario Player Development League.

The USSA announced on April 15, 2020 that they were ceasing operations permanently due to financial struggles brought on by the COVID-19 pandemic. In response, MLS announced that it was creating MLS Next as a replacement elite youth player development platform, which Toronto FC would participate in.

In March 2024, it was announced that Toronto FC Academy would enter a U19 team in the League1 Ontario's second tier Championship competition, with the ability to be promoted to the top tier Premier competition, after purchasing the franchise license formerly held by Pickering FC. However, after one season, the team once again departed the league, choosing to re-enter the team in MLS Next, following the launch of a new U18 division.

== BMO Training Ground ==
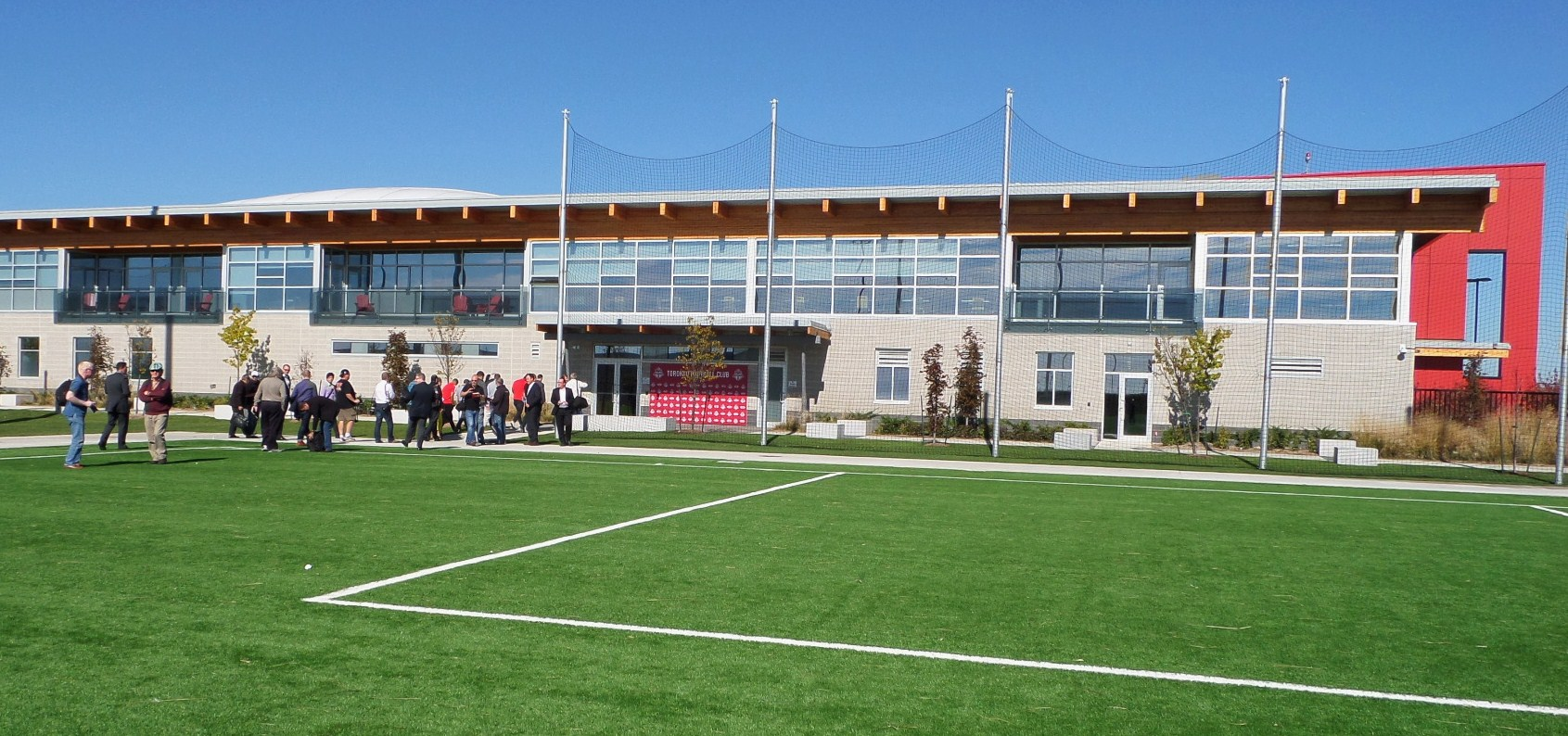
Side view of the BMO training ground

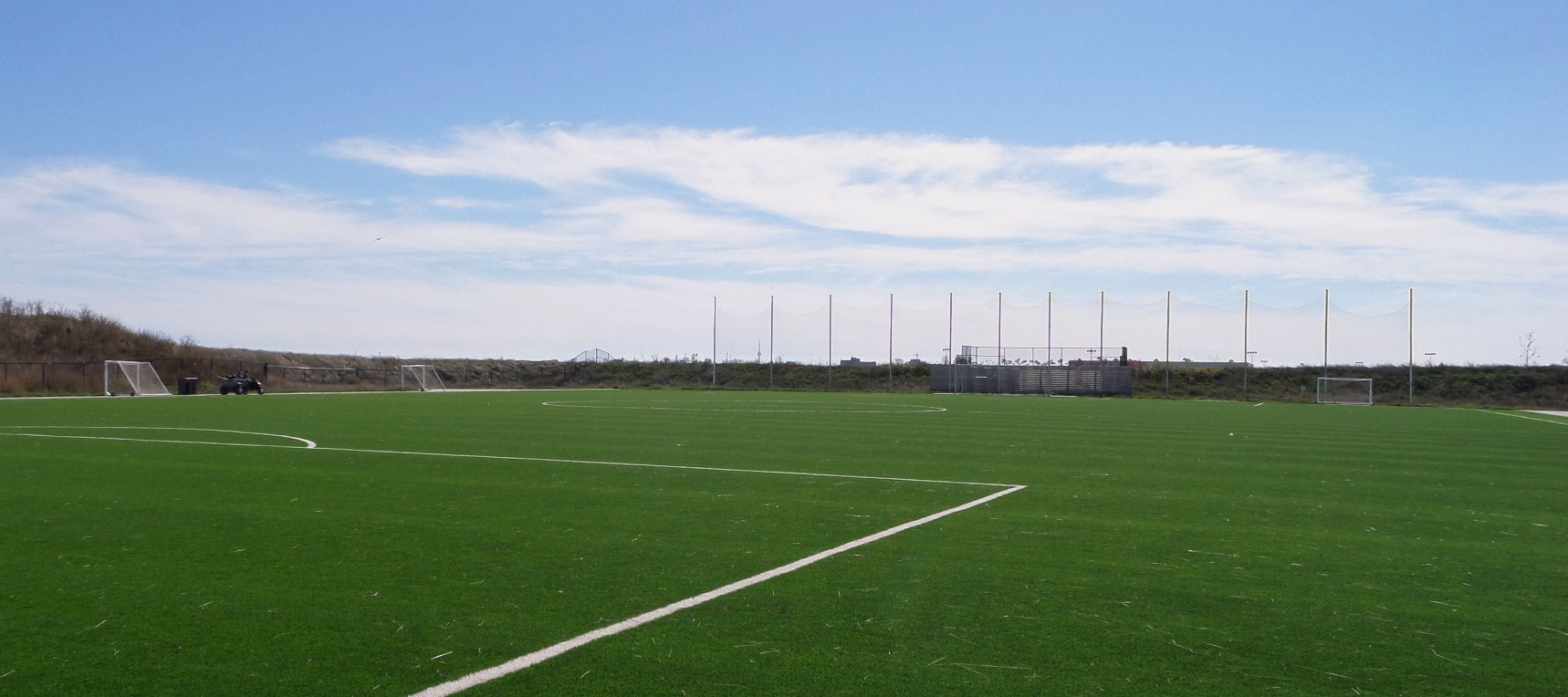
Field at the BMO training ground

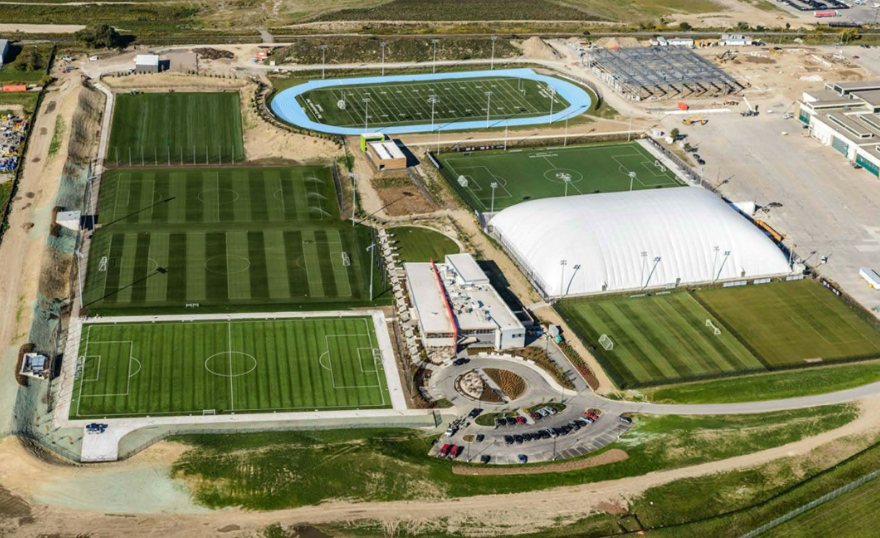
Bird's-eye view

In April 2011, Toronto FC unveiled plans to develop a state-of-art facility and soccer program that looked to develop the next generation of Canadian players through coaching, training, technology, equipment and support. Construction began in May 2011 and in June 2012, TFC academy moved to their new BMO Training Ground on 14 acres of land in Downsview Park, located in North York. Built at a cost of $21 million to MLSE, the facility has 4 pitches in total: four full-sized grass pitches (two heated) and 1 artificial turf pitches (1 capable of being bubbled for year-round use). The 36,000 square foot facility also contains first team facilities (dressing room, hot tub, ice bath, rehabilitation pool, physiotherapy room, private dining) seven dressing rooms for the Academy teams, gym, physio and rehab facilities (separate from first team), kitchen, cafeteria, media room, classroom and offices for coaching staff.

== Current technical staff ==
Executives
Academy director	(Canada) Anthony Capotosto
Assistant Academy director	(Canada) Dino Lopez
Medical	(Canada) Esteban Clavijo, Athletic Therapist
Manager Academy scouting	(Canada) Chris Pozniak
Operations	(Canada) Diana Sciacchitano
Equipment	(Canada) McKenzie Jaglowitz
Academy Player Care & Engagement	(Canada) Mendel Murray
Performance Coach	(Canada) Francesco Vescio

Coaching staff
Year	Head coach	Assistant coach	Goalkeeper coach
Toronto FC II	(Canada) Gianni Cimini	(Canada) Marco Casalinuovo	(Canada) David Monsalve
Toronto FC U19	(Canada) Dino Lopez	(Canada) Marcus Laquie	(Canada) Paolo Ceccarelli
Toronto FC U17	(Canada) Paul Stalteri	(Canada) Taylor Lord	(Republic of Ireland) David Ennis
Toronto FC U16	(Canada) Dejan Jakovic	(Canada) Nikola Stakic	(Republic of Ireland) David Ennis
Toronto FC U15	(Canada) Arman Mohammadi	(Canada) Nikola Stakic	(Canada) Lauren Kadet
Toronto FC U14	(Canada) Nemanja Jovanovic	(Canada)	(Canada) Lauren Kadet

== Head coaches (U19) ==
- (Canada) Nick Dasovic (2008–2010)
- (Canada) Michael Stefano (2014–2015)
- (Scotland) Stuart Neely (2015–2016)
- (England) Danny Dichio (2016–2020)
- (Canada) Michael Stefano (2020–2021)
- (Canada) Dino Lopez (2021–present)

== Year-by-year (U19) ==
The Senior Academy side, commonly known as Toronto FC III, has played at the semi-professional (Division III) level. The team currently is a U19 team, after having previously been a U20 team

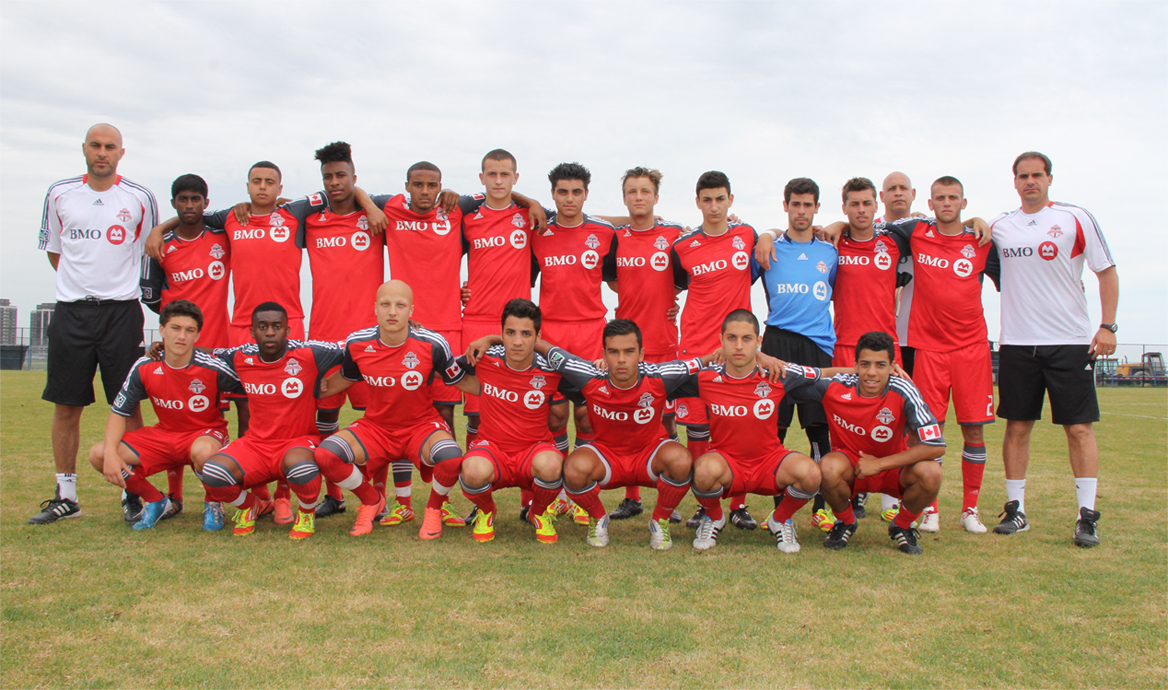
Team in 2012

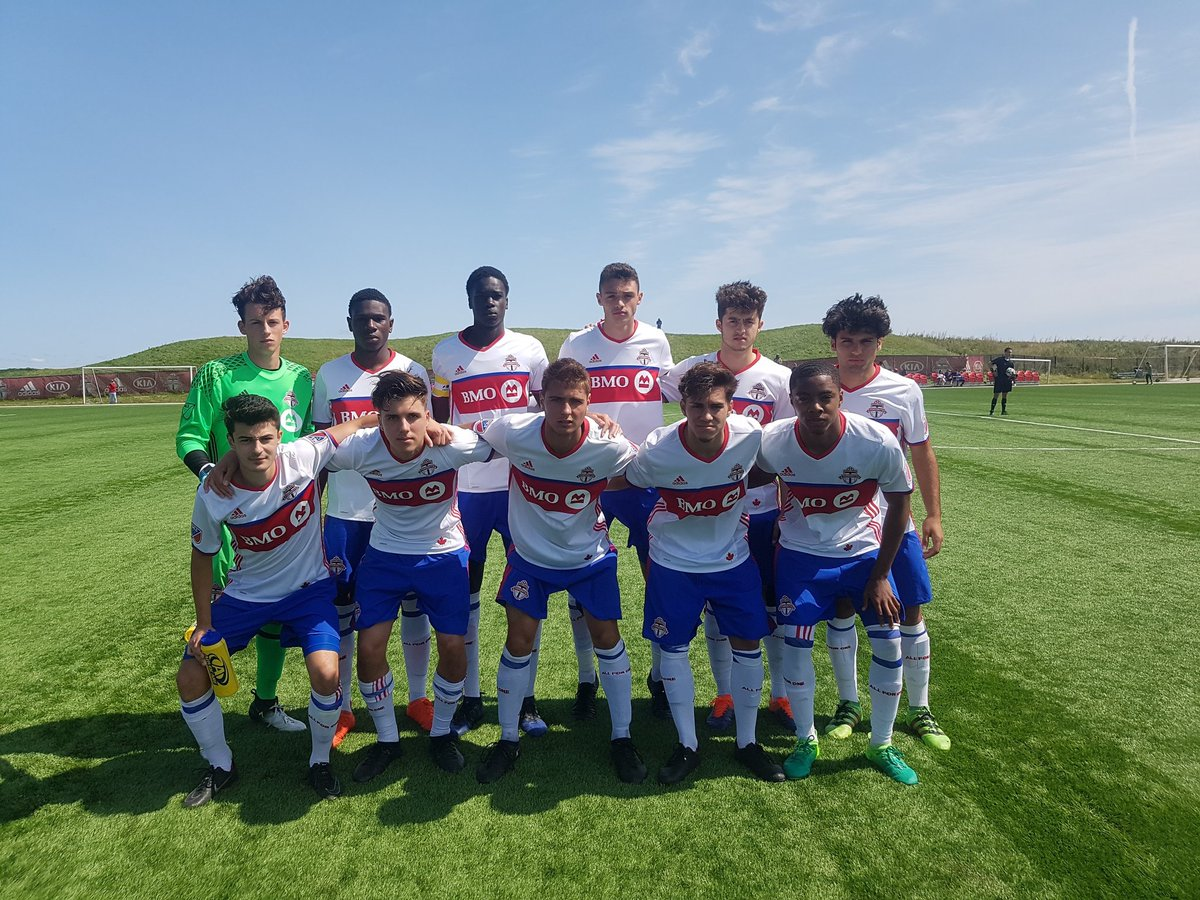
U20 team 2017

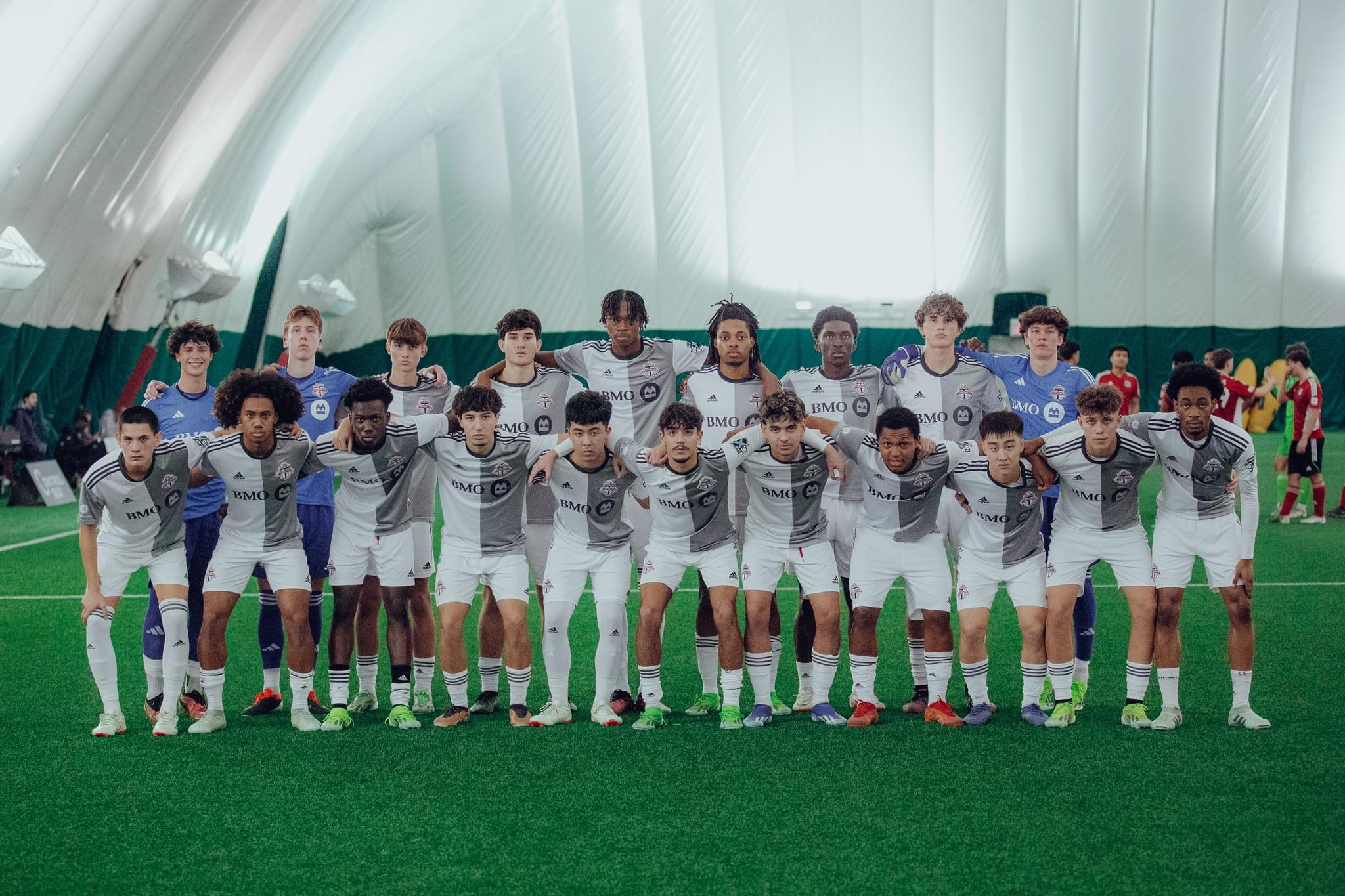
U19-2024

Year	Division	League	Regular season	Playoffs	League cup	Ref
2008	3	Canadian Soccer League	6th, National	Did not qualify	—	
2009	3	Canadian Soccer League	4th, National	Quarterfinals	—	
2010	3	Canadian Soccer League	6th	Quarterfinals	—	
2011	3	Canadian Soccer League	10th	Did not qualify	—	
2012	3	Canadian Soccer League	7th	Quarterfinals	—	
2013	None	Ontario Soccer League	2nd	—	—	
2014	3	League1 Ontario	Champions	Champions (Inter-Provincial Cup)	Semi-finals	
2015	3	League1 Ontario	5th	—	Group stage	
2015	4 (U.S.)	Premier Development League	4th, Great Lakes	Did not qualify	—	
2016	3	League1 Ontario	3rd, Western Conference	Did not qualify	Round of 16	
2016	4 (U.S.)	Premier Development League	6th, Great Lakes	Did not qualify	—	
2017	3	League1 Ontario	3rd, Western Conference	Did not qualify	Quarterfinals	
2018	3	League1 Ontario	4th	Declined participation	Finalists	
2019	Played in the amateur U.S. Soccer Development Academy					
2020	Played in the amateur U.S. Soccer Development Academy					
2021	3 (Note: League1 Ontario held two divisions in 2020 due to the COVID-19 pandemic - the main division and a short season Summer Championship for teams unable to commit to a full season and some invited non-league members. Toronto FC Academy entered both their U19 and U17 teams in this division, as non-league members)	League1 Ontario Summer Championship	1st	—	—	
2022	Youth	MLS Next	7th, Northeastern	Did not qualify	—	
2023	Youth	MLS Next	2nd, Northeastern	Qualified	—	
2023	Youth	League1 Ontario Reserve Fall Division	East, 1st	Champions	—	
2024	3B (Note: League1 Ontario has multi-tiers. TFC Academy played in the second-tier League1 Ontario Championship, however, all three tiers are officially considered to be part of the third tier in the Canadian Soccer system, rather than tiers 3, 4, and 5)	League1 Ontario Championship	Champions	—	First round	

== Academy graduates ==
The following players have joined the Toronto FC first team on homegrown player contracts after having previously been a Toronto FC Academy player (players in bold are currently part of the team) (as of October 3, 2026):

- (Canada) Ayo Akinola (2000)
- (Canada) Themi Antonoglou (2001)
- (Canada) Manny Aparicio (1995)
- (Canada) Molham Babouli (1993)
- (Canada) Sergio Camargo (1994)
- (Canada) Jay Chapman (1994)
- (Canada) **Markus Cimermancic** (2004)
- (Canada) Oscar Cordon (1993)
- (Canada) Aidan Daniels (1998)
- (Canada) **Adisa De Rosario** (2004)
- (Canada) Julian Dunn (2000)
- (Canada) Raheem Edwards (1995)
- (Canada) **Kobe Franklin** (2003)
- (Canada) Liam Fraser (1998)
- (Canada) Jordan Hamilton (1996)
- (Canada) Doneil Henry (1993)
- (Canada) **Stefan Kapor** (2009)
- (Canada) **Deandre Kerr** (2002)
- (Canada) Nicholas Lindsay (1992)
- (Canada) Keith Makubuya (1993)
- (Canada) Chris Mannella (1994)
- (Canada) Jahkeele Marshall-Rutty (2004)
- (Canada) Hugo Mbongue (2004)
- (Canada) Ashtone Morgan (1991)
- (Canada) Jayden Nelson (2002)
- (Canada) Noble Okello (2000)
- (Canada) **Adam Pearlman** (2005)
- (Canada) Luca Petrasso (2000)
- (Canada) Jordan Perruzza (2002)
- (Canada) Ralph Priso (2002)
- (Canada) Quillan Roberts (1994)
- (Canada) Rocco Romeo (2000)
- (The Gambia) Amadou Sanyang (Note: Amadou Sanyang joined Toronto FC via transfer in March 2009, however, due to his age he was initially ineligible to join the senior squad until his 18th birthday, so he temporarily played for the Academy until he turned 18 in August 2009. As such, he was signed under a regular contract, as he was not eligible for a Homegrown contract.) (1991)
- (Canada) Jacob Shaffelburg (1999)
- (Canada) Luke Singh (2000)
- (Canada) **Lazar Stefanovic** (2006)
- (Canada) Matt Stinson (1992)
- (Canada) Kosi Thompson (2003)

The following players have signed for the Toronto FC first team on short-term loan contracts for MLS or Canadian Championship matches (players in bold are currently Toronto FC II players), after having been a Toronto FC Academy player, but did not sign a full-time contract (as of October 3, 2026):

- (Canada) Julian Altobelli (2002)
- (Canada) **Antone Bossenberry** (2007)
- (Canada) Antony Curic (2001)
- (Canada) **Andrei Dumitru** (2006)
- (Canada) Jordan Faria (2000)
- (United States) **Reid Fisher** (2003)
- (Canada) Malik Johnson (1998)
- (Canada) Allando Matheson (1992)
- (Jamaica) **Jahmarie Nolan** (2007)
- (Canada) **Theo Rigopoulos** (2007)
- (Canada) Steffen Yeates (2000)

The following players spent time developing inside the Toronto FC Academy before appearing for the first team under regular MLS contracts (as of October 3, 2026):

- (Canada) Richard Chukwu (2008)
- (Canada) Mark-Anthony Kaye (1994)
- (Canada) **Jonathan Osorio** (1992)

The following players signed homegrown player contracts with other teams in Major League Soccer, having had their rights traded by Toronto FC after previously being a Toronto FC Academy player (as of October 3, 2026):

- (Canada) Josh Janniere (1992)
- (Canada) Jacen Russell-Rowe (2002)

== International matches ==
TFC Academy joined with Chile giants Colo-Colo. The Toronto FC Academy squad played their first game against opponents outside the Canadian Soccer League on Tuesday June 29, 2010. The Academy tied Colo-Colo 4–4. The U16 team competed Liga MX International tournament in August 2017. Toronto FC III participated in the Dallas Cup 2018.

== TFC Juniors ==

The Toronto FC Juniors, also known as the TFC Juniors, was part of the youth academy and development system of Toronto FC. It was a curriculum based program, for players aged six to thirteen, specializing in grassroots development with a professional coaching staff. The program held camps regionally and has held camps in Toronto, Pickering, Vaughan, Stoney Creek in Hamilton, Oakville, and Markham. The Toronto FC Juniors program was one of Toronto FC Academy's main sources for prospects alongside their network of scouts. The program was discontinued in 2021.

== Regional partners ==
TFC Academy affiliate clubs as of 2026

In 2015, Toronto FC formed a partnership with the Ontario Soccer Association, with the OSA recognizing TFC as the top of the pyramid in Ontario with respect to the player pathway for elite men's soccer. Following this, TFC began to form regional partnerships with various youth clubs.

TFC Academy has made regional partnerships with local youth clubs in other Ontario cities re-branding under the TFC name - Windsor TFC, London TFC, and Ottawa TFC. Windsor TFC was the re-branded name from Windsor Stars SC, whose senior team plays in League1 Ontario.; London TFC was re-branded from FC London, whose senior team retained their name in L1O; Ottawa TFC was formed from a merger of Cumberland United SC and Capital United SC. At the end of 2025, Ottawa's licensing agreement expired and they formed a new partnership with Canadian Premier League club Atlético Ottawa instead, re-branding as Atlético Ottawa Juniors.

In 2021, the club announced three new regional partners: Kitchener TFC, Hamilton TFC, and DeRo TFC. Kitchener TFC rebranded from Kitchener SC, Hamilton TFC rebranded from Mount Hamilton Youth SC (Mount Hamilton is also part of the Hamilton United group that competes in League1 Ontario) and DeRo TFC rebranded from DeRo United Futbol Academy.

== Honours ==
League

- League1 Ontario:
  - Regular Season Champions: 2014
  - Summer Championship Division: 2021
  - Championship Division: 2024

Cup

- Inter-Provincial Cup
  - Winners: 2014
- League1 Ontario Cup
  - Winners: 2023
  - Runners-up: 2018

== See also ==
- Toronto FC II
