= Toronto FC II =

Canadian soccer team

- Nickname: Young Reds
- Short name: TFCII
- Founded: November 20, 2014 (11 years ago)
- Stadium: York Lions Stadium
- Owner: Maple Leaf Sports & Entertainment
- Head coach: Gianni Cimini
- League: MLS Next Pro
- 2025: 9th, Eastern Conference; Playoffs: DNQ
- Website: torontofc.ca/tfc2
Home colours	Away colours

Toronto FC II is a Canadian professional soccer team based in Toronto, Ontario, that competes in MLS Next Pro, a third tier league of the United States soccer league system. It is the reserve team and minor league affiliate of Toronto FC as well as in partnership with Toronto FC Academy.

== History ==
=== Pre-history ===
Upon their entrance into Major League Soccer, Toronto FC fielded their reserves in the MLS Reserve League from 2007 to 2013. In 2014, Toronto FC entered into a one-year partnership with the Wilmington Hammerheads of the USL to serve as their affiliate, with whom they would loan players to.

=== Formation ===
On November 20, 2014, Toronto FC announced the creation of a reserve team that would play in the third-tier United Soccer League under the name Toronto FC II. The team began play in March 2015, playing at the then-newly constructed 3,500-seat stadium at the Ontario Soccer Centre in Vaughan, just north-northwest of Toronto. They played their first match on June 27, 2015, against Wilmington Hammerheads. From 2017, the USL was sanctioned as a second-tier league.

On July 2, 2018, the team announced that it would move down from the United Soccer League to USL League One for the league's first season in 2019. TFC II played in Saskatoon for the first SK Summer Soccer Series, which was hosted by the Saskatchewan Selects. The Selects defeated TFC II 2–0.

In July 2020, the team withdrew from the 2020 USL League One season, due to travel restrictions caused by the COVID-19 pandemic. They returned to the league in 2021, beginning the season at the Grande Sports World training facility in Casa Grande, Arizona, due to continued travel restrictions caused by the continuing pandemic. After playing their first three home games there, following three home games were played at Osceola Heritage Park in Kissimmee, Florida. Toronto FC II ultimately resumed playing their home games in Toronto on July 30, 2021, when they hosted Greenville Triumph SC at the BMO Training Ground.

=== MLS Next Pro ===
The club announced on December 6, 2021, that it was joining the 21-team MLS Next Pro for the inaugural 2022 season. In their debut season, they qualified for their first-ever playoff berth, after winning the Northeast Division. After defeating Philadelphia Union 2 in the Conference semi-finals, they were defeated by Columbus Crew 2 in extra time in the Conference finals.

On July 14, 2026, it was announced the team would be relocated to Barrie for the 2028–29 season, to play at a new stadium to be constructed in the city. The City of Barrie will invest $26 million into constructing the stadium, which will seat 3,500 spectators and be expandable to 6,500, while Barrie Stadium Group will develop and operate it. MLSE will continue to own the franchise and be responsible for managing sporting related activities, while Barrie Stadium Group will manage commercial operations such as ticketing and sponsorships.

== Players and staff ==
=== Roster ===
As of April 29, 2026

No.	Pos.	Nation	Player
38	DF	USA	Jackson Gilman
56	MF	CAN	Antone Bossenberry
58	MF	CAN	Marko Stojadinovic
61	MF	CAN	Tim Fortier
62	FW	CAN	Joshua Nugent
63	MF	CAN	Shyon Pinnock
64	FW	JAM	Jahmarie Nolan
65	MF	JAM	Raequan Campbell-Dennis
66	MF	CAN	Diego Nue-Brito
67	FW	CAN	Kervon Kerr
68	FW	CAN	Demitre Adamson
69	MF	CAN	Tristan Blyth
70	GK	CAN	Harrison Patterson
72	DF	CAN	Daniel Stampatori
73	DF	CAN	Micah Chisholm
74	DF	DEN	Luca Costabile
75	DF	USA	Reid Fisher
79	MF	USA	Fletcher Bank
80	GK	CAN	Zakaria Nakhly
82	MF	USA	Bryce Boneau
83	DF	CAN	Edwin Omoregbe
84	FW	ALG	Elias Khodri
85	MF	CAN	Spencer Sappleton
86	MF	CIV	Abundance Salaou
91	FW	CAN	Dékwon Barrow
92	DF	CAN	Theo Rigopoulos
93	MF	CAN	Damar Dixon (on loan from Frosinone)
96	DF	CAN	Richard Chukwu

Toronto FC Academy player

=== Technical staff ===
As of March 30, 2022

Coaching staff
Head coach	(Canada) Gianni Cimini
Assistant coach	(Canada) Marco Casalinuovo
Goalkeeping coach	(Canada) David Monsalve

== Record ==
Season	Tier	League	Teams	Record	Rank	Playoffs	Ref
2015	3	USL	24	6–5–16	11th, Eastern (23rd overall)	did not qualify	
2016	3	USL	29	6–5–17	13th, Eastern (26th overall)	did not qualify	
2017	2	USL	30	6–7–19	15th, Eastern (28th overall)	did not qualify	
2018	2	USL	33	4–6–24	16th, Eastern (33rd overall)	did not qualify	
2019	3	USL League One	10	9–9–10	7th	did not qualify	
2020	3	USL League One	Withdrew due to COVID-19 restrictions				
2021	3	USL League One	12	10–8–10	7th	did not qualify	
2022	3	MLS Next Pro	21	12–3–9 (Note: MLS Next Pro teams played shootouts to earn an extra point after ties. Of the three ties in 2022, Toronto FC had two Shootout wins and one Shootout loss for a total record of 12-2-1-9)	2nd, Eastern (7th, overall)	Conference Final	
2023	3	MLS Next Pro	27	6–8–14 (Note: MLS Next Pro teams played shootouts to earn an extra point after ties. Of the eight ties in 2023, Toronto FC had three Shootout wins and five Shootout losses for a total record of 6-3-5-14)	11th, Eastern (23rd, overall)	did not qualify	
2024	3	MLS Next Pro	29	10–6–12 (Note: MLS Next Pro teams played shootouts to earn an extra point after ties. Of the six ties in 2024, Toronto FC had one Shootout win and five Shootout losses for a total record of 10-1-5-12)	12th, Eastern (23rd, overall)	did not qualify	
2025	3	MLS Next Pro	29	10–6–12 (Note: MLS Next Pro teams played shootouts to earn an extra point after ties. Of the six ties in 2025, Toronto FC had two Shootout wins and four Shootout losses for a total record of 10-2-4-12)	9th, Eastern (19th, overall)	did not qualify	
2026	3	MLS Next Pro	30	11–4–13 (Note: MLS Next Pro teams played shootouts to earn an extra point after ties. Of the four ties in 2025, Toronto FC had two Shootout wins and two Shootout losses for a total record of 11-2-2-13)	12th, Eastern (22nd, overall)	did not qualify	

== Coach history ==
- (Canada) Jason Bent (2015–2017)
- (France) Laurent Guyot (2018)
- (United States) Michael Rabasca (2018–2019)
- (United States) Mike Muñoz (2020–2021)
- (Canada) Gianni Cimini (2022–present)

== Stadium ==
The expansion Toronto FC II hosted their games at a new stadium constructed at the Ontario Soccer Centre beginning with the first season in 2015. However, after the planned expansion of the OSC to 5,000 seats, which is a minimum requirement set by the United States Soccer Federation for the USL to be sanctioned as a division 2 league, did not materialize, the club announced that it would move its home games to BMO Field and Lamport Stadium beginning with the 2018 season.

In 2018, the team used Monarch Park Stadium for one game in May, relocated one game to Charlotte, and relocated another four games to Rochester's Marina Auto Stadium, while waiting on availability at Lamport Stadium.

With their drop to the division 3 USL League One for the 2019 season, the team moved their home games to BMO Training Ground.

On April 4, 2022, after the team left USL League One to join the newly formed MLS Next Pro, Toronto FC II announced that York Lions Stadium would serve as their new home stadium, while also playing 2 home games at BMO Field as a second match of a double header with their parent club, Toronto FC.

== See also ==
- Toronto FC Academy
