= List of Toronto FC players =

This is a list of players who have played for Toronto FC.

== List of players ==
Competitive matches only. Players in bold are currently on the team roster. Stats and roster are accurate as of the 2025 season on October 18, 2025. The all-time roster currently sits at 320 players, including 286 who have played at least one competitive game for Toronto FC.

Player				Total		MLS Regular Season (Note: Includes MLS is Back Tournament group stage matches)		MLS Cup playoffs		Canadian Championship		CONCACAF Champions Cup		Other (Note: Includes Campeones Cup, Leagues Cup and MLS is Back Tournament knockout stage matches)	
Name	Nation	Position	Toronto career	Apps	Goals	Apps	Goals	Apps	Goals	Apps	Goals	Apps	Goals	Apps	Goals
Miguel Aceval	(Chile)	DF	2012	10	1	5	0	0	0	1	0	4	1	0	0
Ifunanyachi Achara	(Nigeria)	FW	2020–2022	34	4	30	3	0	0	4	1	0	0	0	0
Gale Agbossoumonde	(United States)	DF	2013–2014	13	0	13	0	0	0	0	0	0	0	0	0
Ager Aketxe	(Spain)	MF	2018	14	0	11	0	0	0	0	0	3	0	0	0
Ayo Akinola (Note: Homegrown player) (Note: Young designated player or U22 Initiative)	(Canada)	FW	2018–2024	96	18	83	15	1	0	8	3	4	0	0	0
Øyvind Alseth	(Norway)	DF	2017	4	0	4	0	0	0	0	0	0	0	0	0
Jozy Altidore (Note: Designated player) (Note: Name listed on Toronto FC's Wall of Honour)	(United States)	FW	2015–2021	173	79	139	62	13	8	9	6	10	3	2	0
Quincy Amarikwa	(United States)	FW	2012	14	2	11	0	0	0	0	0	3	2	0	0
Themi Antonoglou	(Canada)	DF	2022–2023	15	0	13	0	0	0	0	0	0	0	2	0
Nana Attakora	(Canada)	DF	2007–2011	68	4	56	3	0	0	6	0	6	1	0	0
Auro Jr.	(Brazil)	DF	2018–2022	109	0	84	0	5	0	4	0	14	0	2	0
Eric Avila	(United States)	MF	2011–2012	39	2	33	2	0	0	4	0	2	0	0	0
Molham Babouli	(Canada)	FW	2016–2017	20	0	16	0	0	0	4	0	0	0	0	0
Jon Bakero	(Spain)	FW	2018–2019	3	0	3	0	0	0	0	0	0	0	0	0
Chad Barrett	(United States)	FW	2008–2010	78	21	65	16	0	0	7	3	6	2	0	0
**Dékwon Barrow**	(Canada)	FW	2025–	1	0	0	0	0	0	1	0	0	0	0	0
Jesús Batiz	(Honduras)	MF	2023–2024	4	0	2	0	0	0	1	0	0	0	1	0
Steven Beitashour	(Iran)	DF	2016–2017	68	0	51	0	11	0	6	0	0	0	0	0
Kyle Bekker	(Canada)	MF	2013–2014	35	0	29	0	0	0	6	0	0	0	0	0
Joe Bendik	(United States)	GK	2013–2015	77	0	73	0	0	0	4	0	0	0	0	0
Nicolas Benezet	(France)	FW	2019	13	3	8	2	4	1	1	0	0	0	0	0
Ashton Bennett	(Jamaica)	FW	2013	1	0	0	0	0	0	1	0	0	0	0	0
Federico Bernardeschi	(Italy)	FW	2022–2025	99	26	88	25	0	0	7	1	0	0	4	0
Latif Blessing	(Ghana)	MF	2023–2024	7	0	5	0	0	0	0	0	0	0	2	0
Mark Bloom	(United States)	DF	2013–2016	44	0	39	0	2	0	3	0	0	0	0	0
Alex Bono	(United States)	GK	2015–2022	157	0	130	0	5	0	7	0	14	0	1	0
Danleigh Borman	(South Africa)	DF	2011	29	0	22	0	0	0	3	0	4	0	0	0
John Bostock	(England)	MF	2013	9	0	7	0	0	0	2	0	0	0	0	0
Terrence Boyd	(United States)	FW	2019	13	0	11	0	0	0	0	0	2	0	0	0
Andrew Boyens	(New Zealand)	DF	2007–2008	23	1	23	1	0	0	0	0	0	0	0	0
Michael Bradley (Note: Team captain)	(United States)	MF	2014–2023	308	19	258	16	17	1	17	2	14	0	2	0
Justin Braun	(United States)	FW	2013	22	2	21	2	0	0	1	0	0	0	0	0
Adam Braz	(Canada)	DF	2007	13	0	13	0	0	0	0	0	0	0	0	0
Jim Brennan	(Canada)	DF	2007–2010	93	4	84	4	0	0	7	0	2	0	0	0
Jeremy Brockie	(New Zealand)	FW	2013	15	1	15	1	0	0	0	0	0	0	0	0
Ola Brynhildsen	(Norway)	FW	2025	22	2	21	2	0	0	1	0	0	0	0	0
Edson Buddle	(United States)	FW	2007	10	0	10	0	0	0	0	0	0	0	0	0
Junior Burgos	(El Salvador)	MF	2012	2	0	2	0	0	0	0	0	0	0	0	0
Steven Caldwell	(Scotland)	DF	2013–2015	49	1	46	1	0	0	3	0	0	0	0	0
Danny Califf	(United States)	DF	2013	6	0	4	0	0	0	2	0	0	0	0	0
Miguel Cañizalez	(Canada)	MF	2007	12	1	12	1	0	0	0	0	0	0	0	0
Adrian Cann	(Canada)	DF	2010–2012	65	0	48	0	0	0	9	0	8	0	0	0
Conor Casey	(United States)	FW	2007	2	0	2	0	0	0	0	0	0	0	0	0
Júlio César	(Brazil)	GK	2014	7	0	7	0	0	0	0	0	0	0	0	0
Jay Chapman	(Canada)	MF	2015–2019	88	6	79	6	0	0	6	0	2	0	1	0
Benoît Cheyrou	(France)	MF	2015–2017	68	5	55	2	5	1	8	2	0	0	0	0
Kadin Chung	(Canada)	DF	2022	9	0	8	0	0	0	1	0	0	0	0	0
**José Cifuentes**	(Ecuador)	MF	2025–	7	0	7	0	0	0	0	0	0	0	0	0
Laurent Ciman	(Belgium)	DF	2019–2020	35	0	29	0	3	0	1	0	2	0	0	0
**Markus Cimermancic**	(Canada)	MF	2025–	9	0	9	0	0	0	0	0	0	0	0	0
**Alonso Coello**	(Spain)	MF	2023–	85	2	77	2	0	0	6	0	0	0	2	0
Bobby Convey	(United States)	MF	2013	21	1	21	1	0	0	0	0	0	0	0	0
Jon Conway	(United States)	GK	2010	6	0	1	0	0	0	1	0	4	0	0	0
Armando Cooper	(Panama)	MF	2016; 2017	36	1	25	0	10	1	1	0	0	0	0	0
**Theo Corbeanu**	(Canada)	FW	2025–	33	7	32	6	0	0	1	1	0	0	0	0
Oscar Cordon	(Canada)	MF	2011–2012	7	0	4	0	0	0	2	0	1	0	0	0
Warren Creavalle	(United States)	DF	2014–2015	26	2	24	2	0	0	2	0	0	0	0	0
Domenico Criscito	(Italy)	DF	2022	16	1	15	1	0	0	1	0	0	0	0	0
Sam Cronin	(United States)	MF	2009–2010	41	1	33	1	0	0	6	0	2	0	0	0
Jeff Cunningham	(United States)	FW	2007–2008	36	6	32	6	0	0	4	0	0	0	0	0
Antony Ćurić	(Canada)	DF	2023–2024	2	0	1	0	0	0	1	0	0	0	0	0
Aidan Daniels	(Canada)	MF	2018–2019	1	0	1	0	0	0	0	0	0	0	0	0
Kyle Davies	(United States)	DF	2011	1	0	1	0	0	0	0	0	0	0	0	0
Julian de Guzman	(Canada)	MF	2009–2012	93	3	65	2	0	0	10	0	18	1	0	0
Dwayne De Rosario	(Canada)	FW	2009–2011; 2014	98	33	76	28	0	0	12	4	10	1	0	0
Jermain Defoe	(England)	FW	2014	21	12	19	11	0	0	2	1	0	0	0	0
Nick DeLeon	(United States)	MF	2019–2021	83	12	69	8	5	2	4	2	4	0	1	0
Mark Delgado (Note: Homegrown player rights acquired in trade)	(United States)	MF	2015–2021	225	17	181	15	11	1	17	1	14	0	2	0
Danny Dichio	(England)	FW	2007–2009	66	14	59	14	0	0	5	0	2	0	0	0
Bright Dike	(Nigeria)	FW	2013–2015	11	1	11	1	0	0	0	0	0	0	0	0
Adama Diomande	(Norway)	FW	2023	5	0	5	0	0	0	0	0	0	0	0	0
Srdjan Djekanović	(Canada)	GK	2007	8	0	8	0	0	0	0	0	0	0	0	0
Maxime Dominguez	(Switzerland)	MF	2025	25	0	24	0	0	0	1	0	0	0	0	0
Griffin Dorsey	(United States)	MF	2019–2021	5	0	2	0	0	0	0	0	3	0	0	0
Andrei Dumitru	(Canada)	MF	2024	2	0	0	0	0	0	2	0	0	0	0	0
Terry Dunfield	(Canada)	MF	2011–2013	56	6	40	3	0	0	4	0	12	3	0	0
Todd Dunivant	(United States)	DF	2007–2008	27	0	27	0	0	0	0	0	0	0	0	0
Julian Dunn	(Canada)	DF	2018–2021	4	0	3	0	0	0	1	0	0	0	0	0
Dom Dwyer	(United States)	FW	2021	15	0	14	0	0	0	1	0	0	0	0	0
Robert Earnshaw	(Wales)	FW	2013	27	8	26	8	0	0	1	0	0	0	0	0
Richard Eckersley	(England)	DF	2011; 2012–2013	92	0	72	0	0	0	7	0	13	0	0	0
Maurice Edu	(United States)	MF	2007–2008	41	6	38	5	0	0	3	1	0	0	0	0
Brian Edwards	(United States)	GK	2008–2010	9	0	9	0	0	0	0	0	0	0	0	0
Nathaniel Edwards	(Canada)	DF	2024–2025	1	0	0	0	0	0	1	0	0	0	0	0
**Raheem Edwards**	(Canada)	MF	2016–2017; 2026–	27	1	22	1	1	0	4	0	0	0	0	0
Jonas Elmer	(Switzerland)	DF	2011	3	0	3	0	0	0	0	0	0	0	0	0
Logan Emory	(United States)	DF	2012–2013	29	0	26	0	0	0	1	0	2	0	0	0
Tsubasa Endoh	(Japan)	FW	2016–2017; 2019–2021	80	10	66	7	4	0	7	3	3	0	0	0
Hogan Ephraim	(England)	FW	2013	12	0	11	0	0	0	1	0	0	0	0	0
Alecko Eskandarian	(United States)	FW	2007	6	1	6	1	0	0	0	0	0	0	0	0
**Derrick Etienne Jr.**	(Haiti)	FW	2024–	55	5	48	3	0	0	4	1	0	0	3	1
Jordan Faria	(Canada)	MF	2023	1	0	1	0	0	0	0	0	0	0	0	0
Lesly Fellinga	(Haiti)	DF	2009	4	0	4	0	0	0	0	0	0	0	0	0
Miguel "Mista" Ferrer	(Spain)	FW	2010	14	1	9	0	0	0	0	0	5	1	0	0
Robbie Findley	(United States)	FW	2015	26	2	25	2	1	0	0	0	0	0	0	0
Deiby Flores	(Honduras)	MF	2024–2025	58	3	48	3	0	0	7	0	0	0	3	0
**Kobe Franklin**	(Canada)	DF	2022–	74	1	64	0	0	0	7	0	0	0	3	1
Liam Fraser	(Canada)	MF	2018–2021	39	0	33	0	1	0	4	0	1	0	0	0
Hunter Freeman	(United States)	DF	2008	7	0	7	0	0	0	0	0	0	0	0	0
Stefan Frei	(Switzerland)	GK	2009–2013	99	0	82	0	0	0	11	0	6	0	0	0
Torsten Frings	(Germany)	MF	2011–2012	46	2	33	2	0	0	3	0	10	0	0	0
Gabe Gala	(Canada)	MF	2007–2010	22	0	17	0	0	0	4	0	1	0	0	0
Tony Gallacher	(Scotland)	DF	2020	10	0	9	0	1	0	0	0	0	0	0	0
Erickson Gallardo	(Venezuela)	FW	2019–2021	16	0	10	0	1	0	3	0	1	0	1	0
Nick Garcia	(United States)	DF	2009–2010	48	0	36	0	0	0	4	0	8	0	0	0
Dan Gargan	(United States)	DF	2010–2011	55	1	43	1	0	0	5	0	7	0	0	0
Derek Gaudet	(Canada)	MF	2008–2009	1	0	1	0	0	0	0	0	0	0	0	0
**Luka Gavran**	(Canada)	GK	2023–	21	0	16	0	0	0	5	0	0	0	0	0
Ali Gerba	(Canada)	FW	2009–2010	13	1	11	1	0	0	0	0	2	0	0	0
Gilberto	(Brazil)	FW	2014–2015	32	7	28	7	0	0	4	0	0	0	0	0
Sebastian Giovinco	(Italy)	FW	2015–2018	142	83	114	68	11	5	8	6	8	4	1	0
Matt Gold	(United States)	MF	2011	6	0	3	0	0	0	2	0	1	0	0	0
Kevin Goldthwaite	(United States)	DF	2007	9	1	9	1	0	0	0	0	0	0	0	0
Emmanuel Gómez	(The Gambia)	DF	2009–2010	10	0	9	0	0	0	0	0	1	0	0	0
Herculez Gomez	(United States)	FW	2015	8	1	7	1	1	0	0	0	0	0	0	0
**Nicksoen Gomis**	(France)	DF	2024–	37	0	30	0	0	0	5	0	0	0	2	0
Jackson Gonçalves	(Brazil)	MF	2014–2015	53	5	52	5	1	0	0	0	0	0	0	0
Omar Gonzalez	(United States)	DF	2019–2021	73	4	64	4	2	0	2	0	4	0	1	0
Alan Gordon	(United States)	FW	2011	10	6	8	4	0	0	2	2	0	0	0	0
Léandre Griffit	(France)	MF	2011	1	0	0	0	0	0	0	0	1	0	0	0
Amado Guevara	(Honduras)	MF	2008–2009	53	11	46	9	0	0	6	2	1	0	0	0
Cristian Gutiérrez	(Canada)	DF	2023	6	0	6	0	0	0	0	0	0	0	0	0
Nick Hagglund	(United States)	DF	2014–2018	115	6	88	5	10	1	12	0	4	0	1	0
Freddy Hall	(Bermuda)	GK	2012	10	0	7	0	0	0	0	0	3	0	0	0
Jeremy Hall	(United States)	DF	2012–2014	67	2	57	2	0	0	6	0	4	0	0	0
Jordan Hamilton	(Canada)	FW	2014–2019	66	15	53	11	0	0	9	3	4	1	0	0
Ty Harden	(United States)	DF	2010–2012	63	1	43	0	0	0	6	1	14	0	0	0
Kevin Harmse	(Canada)	MF	2008–2009	33	1	28	0	0	0	5	1	0	0	0	0
Nicolas Hasler	(Liechtenstein)	DF	2017–2018	32	3	24	3	2	0	1	0	5	0	0	0
Eric Hassli	(France)	FW	2012	8	3	7	3	0	0	0	0	1	0	0	0
Matt Hedges	(United States)	DF	2023	14	0	14	0	0	0	0	0	0	0	0	0
Tyler Hemming	(Canada)	MF	2007–2008	7	0	7	0	0	0	0	0	0	0	0	0
Doneil Henry	(Canada)	DF	2010–2013; 2014; 2022	101	5	77	2	0	0	13	3	11	0	0	0
**Malik Henry**	(Canada)	MF	2025–	9	0	9	0	0	0	0	0	0	0	0	0
Jason Hernandez	(Puerto Rico)	DF	2017–2018	21	0	18	0	0	0	3	0	0	0	0	0
Raivis Hščanovičs	(Latvia)	DF	2010	17	0	11	0	0	0	3	0	3	0	0	0
Franco Ibarra	(Argentina)	MF	2023	8	0	7	0	0	0	0	0	0	0	1	0
Abbe Ibrahim	(Togo)	FW	2007	1	0	1	0	0	0	0	0	0	0	0	0
Fuad Ibrahim	(Ethiopia)	FW	2008–2010	35	3	26	3	0	0	5	0	4	0	0	0
Lorenzo Insigne	(Italy)	FW	2022–2025	76	19	66	15	0	0	7	2	0	0	3	2
Andy Iro	(England)	DF	2011	20	0	13	0	0	0	0	0	7	0	0	0
Clint Irwin	(United States)	GK	2016–2018	49	0	32	0	6	0	11	0	0	0	0	0
Brian James	(United States)	MF	2016	1	0	0	0	0	0	1	0	0	0	0	0
Julius James	(Trinidad and Tobago)	DF	2008	16	1	13	1	0	0	3	0	0	0	0	0
Lucas Janson	(Argentina)	FW	2018	12	5	11	4	0	0	0	0	0	0	1	1
Jesús Jiménez	(Spain)	FW	2022	37	10	33	9	0	0	4	1	0	0	0	0
Malik Johnson	(Canada)	FW	2016; 2018	2	0	0	0	0	0	2	0	0	0	0	0
Ryan Johnson	(Jamaica)	FW	2011–2012	63	18	43	10	0	0	4	2	16	6	0	0
Sean Johnson	(United States)	GK	2023–2025	84	0	76	0	0	0	3	0	0	0	5	0
Will Johnson	(Canada)	MF	2016	32	3	23	2	6	0	3	1	0	0	0	0
Diaz Kambere	(Canada)	DF	2008	1	0	1	0	0	0	0	0	0	0	0	0
Ahmed Kantari	(Morocco)	DF	2015	13	0	12	0	1	0	0	0	0	0	0	0
Mark-Anthony Kaye	(Canada)	MF	2022–2023	30	2	29	2	0	0	1	0	0	0	0	0
**Deandre Kerr**	(Canada)	FW	2022–	104	20	95	15	0	0	7	5	0	0	2	0
Miloš Kocić	(Serbia)	GK	2010–2012	55	0	37	0	0	0	5	0	13	0	0	0
Danny Koevermans	(Netherlands)	FW	2011–2013	41	19	30	17	0	0	1	0	10	2	0	0
Chris Konopka	(United States)	GK	2013–2015	24	0	21	0	1	0	2	0	0	0	0	0
Matías Laba	(Argentina)	MF	2013	16	1	16	1	0	0	0	0	0	0	0	0
Nick LaBrocca	(United States)	MF	2010	36	1	28	1	0	0	3	0	5	0	0	0
Reggie Lambe	(Bermuda)	MF	2012–2013	66	6	55	2	0	0	5	2	6	2	0	0
**Richie Laryea**	(Canada)	DF	2019–2021; 2022–2023; 2024–	146	13	124	12	5	1	10	0	3	0	4	0
Kemar Lawrence	(Jamaica)	DF	2021	26	1	25	1	0	0	1	0	0	0	0	0
Nicholas Lindsay	(Canada)	FW	2010–2012	9	0	4	0	0	0	1	0	4	0	0	0
Andrea Lombardo	(Canada)	FW	2007–2008	17	0	17	0	0	0	0	0	0	0	0	0
Kevin Long	(Republic of Ireland)	DF	2024–2025	59	1	50	0	0	0	6	1	0	0	3	0
Matty Longstaff	(England)	MF	2024–2025	57	3	49	2	0	0	5	1	0	0	3	0
Daniel Lovitz	(United States)	MF	2014–2016	47	0	41	0	0	0	6	0	0	0	0	0
Aimé Mabika	(Zambia)	DF	2023–2024	40	0	33	0	0	0	5	0	0	0	2	0
Lukas MacNaughton	(Canada)	DF	2022–2023	31	1	28	0	0	0	3	1	0	0	0	0
**Cassius Mailula**	(South Africa)	FW	2023–	8	2	5	0	0	0	3	2	0	0	0	0
Keith Makubuya	(Canada)	FW	2011–2012	2	0	2	0	0	0	0	0	0	0	0	0
Peri Marošević	(United States)	FW	2011	14	3	7	2	0	0	0	0	7	1	0	0
Tyrone Marshall	(Jamaica)	DF	2007–2008	43	0	40	0	0	0	3	0	0	0	0	0
Jahkeele Marshall-Rutty	(Canada)	MF	2020–2024	83	1	73	1	0	0	6	0	0	0	4	0
Javier Martina	(Curaçao)	FW	2011	27	2	23	2	0	0	1	0	3	0	0	0
Allando Matheson	(Canada)	FW	2010	1	0	0	0	0	0	1	0	0	0	0	0
Aaron Maund	(United States)	DF	2012	21	0	15	0	0	0	0	0	6	0	0	0
Chris Mavinga	(Democratic Republic of the Congo)	DF	2017–2022	153	0	124	0	10	0	11	0	7	0	1	0
Hugo Mbongue	(Canada)	FW	2022–2025	14	0	12	0	0	0	0	0	0	0	2	0
Joey Melo	(Canada)	MF	2007–2009	5	0	5	0	0	0	0	0	0	0	0	0
**Djordje Mihailovic**	(United States)	MF	2025–	10	4	10	4	0	0	0	0	0	0	0	0
Mariano Miño	(Argentina)	MF	2018	1	0	1	0	0	0	0	0	0	0	0	0
**Zane Monlouis**	(England)	DF	2025–	10	0	10	0	0	0	0	0	0	0	0	0
David Monsalve	(Canada)	GK	2007–2008	1	0	1	0	0	0	0	0	0	0	0	0
Drew Moor	(United States)	DF	2016–2019	108	6	78	5	12	0	10	1	8	0	0	0
Luke Moore	(England)	FW	2014–2016	46	7	42	7	0	0	4	0	0	0	0	0
Ashtone Morgan	(Canada)	DF	2011–2019	168	3	127	2	0	0	19	0	22	1	0	0
Taylor Morgan	(England)	FW	2013	1	0	1	0	0	0	0	0	0	0	0	0
Justin Morrow	(United States)	DF	2014–2021	254	18	207	17	16	0	20	0	10	1	1	0
Patrick Mullins	(United States)	FW	2019–2021	63	6	49	3	4	0	5	1	4	1	1	1
Richard Mulrooney	(United States)	DF	2007	2	0	2	0	0	0	0	0	0	0	0	0
Paulo Nagamura	(Brazil)	MF	2007	4	0	4	0	0	0	0	0	0	0	0	0
Issey Nakajima-Farran	(Canada)	FW	2014	7	2	5	2	0	0	2	0	0	0	0	0
Joseph Nane	(Cameroon)	MF	2010	17	0	11	0	0	0	1	0	5	0	0	0
Jayden Nelson	(Canada)	FW	2020–2022	50	1	45	1	0	0	4	0	0	0	1	0
Ronnie O'Brien	(Republic of Ireland)	MF	2007	13	0	13	0	0	0	0	0	0	0	0	0
Darren O'Dea	(Republic of Ireland)	DF	2012–2013	27	1	26	1	0	0	0	0	1	0	0	0
Dominic Oduro	(Ghana)	FW	2014	24	2	24	2	0	0	0	0	0	0	0	0
Demitrius Omphroy	(Philippines)	DF	2011	1	0	1	0	0	0	0	0	0	0	0	0
Shane O'Neill	(United States)	DF	2022–2024	68	0	60	0	0	0	5	0	0	0	3	0
Bradley Orr	(England)	DF	2014	21	1	19	1	0	0	2	0	0	0	0	0
Noble Okello	(Canada)	MF	2019–2022	30	2	23	1	0	0	4	1	3	0	0	0
**Jonathan Osorio**	(Canada)	MF	2013–	395	69	326	52	17	4	33	8	12	5	7	0
Prince Owusu	(Germany)	FW	2023–2024	45	12	37	9	0	0	5	3	0	0	3	0
**Adam Pearlman**	(Canada)	DF	2022–	1	0	1	0	0	0	0	0	0	0	0	0
Damien Perquis	(Poland)	DF	2015–2016	38	2	37	2	0	0	1	0	0	0	0	0
Jordan Perruzza	(Canada)	FW	2021–2024	30	2	23	1	0	0	5	1	1	0	1	0
Jacob Peterson	(United States)	FW	2010–2011	47	2	37	1	0	0	4	0	6	1	0	0
Raoul Petretta	(Italy)	DF	2023–2025	85	1	76	1	0	0	4	0	0	0	5	0
Pablo Piatti	(Argentina)	FW	2020	19	4	17	4	1	0	0	0	0	0	1	0
Luca Petrasso	(Canada)	FW	2022	27	0	23	0	0	0	4	0	0	0	0	0
Joao Plata	(Ecuador)	FW	2011; 2012	52	10	36	3	0	0	7	1	9	6	0	0
Chris Pozniak	(Canada)	DF	2007	22	0	22	0	0	0	0	0	0	0	0	0
Alejandro Pozuelo	(Spain)	MF	2019–2022	100	30	88	26	5	2	6	2	0	0	1	0
Ralph Priso	(Canada)	MF	2020–2022	33	2	25	2	1	0	3	0	4	0	0	0
Greg Ranjitsingh	(Trinidad and Tobago)	GK	2023–2024	4	0	4	0	0	0	0	0	0	0	0	0
Marco Reda	(Canada)	DF	2007	8	0	8	0	0	0	0	0	0	0	0	0
Tim Regan	(United States)	DF	2008	1	0	1	0	0	0	0	0	0	0	0	0
Álvaro Rey	(Spain)	MF	2013–2014	23	1	20	1	0	0	3	0	0	0	0	0
Sam Reynolds	(United States)	GK	2007	2	0	2	0	0	0	0	0	0	0	0	0
Ryan Richter	(United States)	DF	2013–2014	15	0	13	0	0	0	2	0	0	0	0	0
Rohan Ricketts	(England)	MF	2008–2009	44	6	39	4	0	0	5	2	0	0	0	0
Tosaint Ricketts	(Canada)	FW	2016–2018	66	16	51	13	7	2	5	1	2	0	1	0
Laurent Robert	(France)	MF	2008	21	1	17	1	0	0	4	0	0	0	0	0
Carl Robinson	(Wales)	MF	2007–2010	84	3	74	3	0	0	8	0	2	0	0	0
Dasan Robinson	(United States)	DF	2011	1	0	0	0	0	0	0	0	1	0	0	0
Tomás Romero	(El Salvador)	GK	2023	6	0	6	0	0	0	0	0	0	0	0	0
Tyler Rosenlund	(Canada)	MF	2008–2009	8	1	8	1	0	0	0	0	0	0	0	0
Sigurd Rosted	(Norway)	DF	2023–2025	84	1	77	1	0	0	4	0	0	0	3	0
Paul Rothrock	(United States)	MF	2022	2	0	2	0	0	0	0	0	0	0	0	0
Carlos Ruiz	(Guatemala)	FW	2008	5	0	5	0	0	0	0	0	0	0	0	0
Darel Russell	(England)	MF	2013	18	3	18	3	0	0	0	0	0	0	0	0
Carlos Salcedo	(Mexico)	DF	2022	16	0	13	0	0	0	3	0	0	0	0	0
Collin Samuel	(Trinidad and Tobago)	FW	2007–2008	19	3	19	3	0	0	0	0	0	0	0	0
Maicon Santos	(Brazil)	FW	2010–2011	40	14	32	10	0	0	4	3	4	1	0	0
Amadou Sanyang	(The Gambia)	MF	2009–2010	22	0	20	0	0	0	2	0	0	0	0	0
C. J. Sapong	(United States)	FW	2023	22	1	20	1	0	0	1	0	0	0	1	0
Martin Šarić	(Argentina)	MF	2010	24	1	17	0	0	0	3	0	4	1	0	0
Adrian Serioux	(Canada)	DF	2009	30	2	26	2	0	0	3	0	1	0	0	0
Brandon Servania	(United States)	MF	2023–2024	34	1	31	1	0	0	1	0	0	0	2	0
Jacob Shaffelburg	(Canada)	FW	2019–2022	60	4	46	3	0	0	8	1	5	0	1	0
Charlie Sharp	(United States)	FW	2024–2025	8	0	8	0	0	0	0	0	0	0	0	0
Luis Silva	(United States)	MF	2012–2013	55	7	44	5	0	0	4	0	7	2	0	0
Clément Simonin	(France)	DF	2015–2016	2	0	2	0	0	0	0	0	0	0	0	0
Luke Singh	(Trinidad and Tobago)	DF	2021–2024	8	1	6	1	0	0	0	0	2	0	0	0
Jarrod Smith	(New Zealand)	FW	2008	23	1	20	1	0	0	3	0	0	0	0	0
Johann Smith	(United States)	FW	2008–2009	15	0	14	0	0	0	1	0	0	0	0	0
Nick Soolsma	(Netherlands)	FW	2011–2012	47	4	32	3	0	0	7	0	8	1	0	0
Yeferson Soteldo	(Venezuela)	FW	2021	26	4	24	3	0	0	2	1	0	0	0	0
Ben Spencer	(United States)	FW	2017–2018	5	0	5	0	0	0	0	0	0	0	0	0
Tyrese Spicer	(Trinidad and Tobago)	FW	2024–2025	42	6	40	4	0	0	2	2	0	0	0	0
Kyriakos Stamatopoulos	(Canada)	GK	2007	12	0	12	0	0	0	0	0	0	0	0	0
**Lazar Stefanovic**	(Canada)	DF	2023–	18	0	16	0	0	0	1	0	0	0	1	0
Alen Stevanović	(Serbia)	MF	2011	12	0	12	0	0	0	0	0	0	0	0	0
Matt Stinson	(Canada)	MF	2011–2013	25	0	17	0	0	0	0	0	8	0	0	0
Nathan Sturgis	(United States)	MF	2011	16	0	14	0	0	0	1	0	1	0	0	0
Michael Sullivan	(United States)	MF	2025	1	0	1	0	0	0	0	0	0	0	0	0
Greg Sutton	(Canada)	GK	2007–2009	39	0	34	0	0	0	5	0	0	0	0	0
Mitchell Taintor	(United States)	DF	2018	2	1	1	1	0	0	1	0	0	0	0	0
Tony Tchani	(Cameroon)	MF	2011	17	1	13	1	0	0	4	0	0	0	0	0
Olivier Tébily	(Ivory Coast)	DF	2008	5	0	4	0	0	0	1	0	0	0	0	0
Ryan Telfer	(Trinidad and Tobago)	MF	2018–2019	20	1	16	1	0	0	4	0	0	0	0	0
Michael Thomas	(United States)	MF	2013	1	0	1	0	0	0	0	0	0	0	0	0
**Kosi Thompson**	(Canada)	MF	2022–	111	2	95	2	0	0	12	0	0	0	4	0
Rick Titus	(Trinidad and Tobago)	DF	2008	1	0	1	0	0	0	0	0	0	0	0	0
Maximiliano Urruti	(Argentina)	FW	2013	2	0	2	0	0	0	0	0	0	0	0	0
Maxim Usanov	(Russia)	DF	2010	21	0	14	0	0	0	3	0	4	0	0	0
Gregory van der Wiel	(Netherlands)	DF	2018–2019	34	0	27	0	0	0	0	0	6	0	1	0
Víctor Vázquez	(Spain)	MF	2017–2019; 2023	77	18	64	16	5	2	3	0	5	0	0	0
Marco Vélez	(Puerto Rico)	DF	2008–2009	46	3	38	2	0	0	8	1	0	0	0	0
Eddy Viator	(Guadeloupe)	DF	2011	4	0	3	0	0	0	0	0	1	0	0	0
**Jules-Anthony Vilsaint**	(Canada)	FW	2025–	7	1	7	1	0	0	0	0	0	0	0	0
Pablo Vitti	(Argentina)	FW	2009	32	2	26	2	0	0	4	0	2	0	0	0
Collen Warner	(United States)	MF	2014–2015	51	2	49	2	0	0	2	0	0	0	0	0
Andy Welsh	(England)	MF	2007	20	1	20	1	0	0	0	0	0	0	0	0
Emery Welshman	(Guyana)	FW	2013	2	0	1	0	0	0	1	0	0	0	0	0
Quentin Westberg	(United States)	GK	2019–2022	79	0	68	0	5	0	5	0	0	0	1	0
O'Brian White	(Jamaica)	FW	2009–2010	45	4	33	4	0	0	3	0	9	0	0	0
Andrew Wiedeman	(United States)	FW	2012–2014	43	5	36	4	0	0	3	1	4	0	0	0
Dicoy Williams	(Jamaica)	DF	2011–2012	13	0	10	0	0	0	2	0	1	0	0	0
Josh Williams	(United States)	DF	2015–2016	28	0	27	0	1	0	0	0	0	0	0	0
**Henry Wingo**	(United States)	DF	2024–	13	0	10	0	0	0	1	0	0	0	2	0
Marvell Wynne	(United States)	DF	2007–2009	75	2	67	2	0	0	6	0	2	0	0	0
Steffen Yeates	(Canada)	MF	2022	2	0	2	0	0	0	0	0	0	0	0	0
Mikael Yourassowsky	(Belgium)	DF	2011	26	1	21	0	0	0	3	1	2	0	0	0
Eriq Zavaleta	(El Salvador)	DF	2015–2021	152	2	118	2	11	0	14	0	8	0	1	0
Gianluca Zavarise	(Canada)	MF	2011	16	0	14	0	0	0	0	0	2	0	0	0

== Players without matches ==
- Julian Altobelli
- Emilio Aristizábal (Note: U22 Initiative)
- Manny Aparicio (Note: Homegrown player)
- Richard Asante
- Brandon Aubrey
- Hassan Ayari
- Kyle Bjornethun
- Antone Bossenberry
- Johan Brunell
- Elbekay Bouchiba
- Júlio César
- Sergio Camargo
- Dante Campbell
- Tomer Chencinski
- Richard Chukwu
- Adisa De Rosario
- Ben Dragavon
- Kilian Elkinson
- Mehdi Essoussi
- Reid Fisher
- A. J. Gray
- Kevin Guppy
- David Guzmán
- Zach Herold
- Stefan Kapor
- Stephen Lumley
- Chris Mannella
- Brennan McNicoll
- Christian Núñez
- Mark Pais
- Nelson Palacio
- Boris Pardo
- Caleb Patterson-Sewell
- Matheus Pereira
- Pat Phelan
- Quillan Roberts
- Rocco Romeo
- Brian Rowe
- Josh Sargent (Note: Designated player)
- Kevin Silva
- Charlie Staniland
- William Yarbrough

== Club captains ==
Years	Player	Nation
2007–2010	Jim Brennan	Canada
2010–2011	Dwayne De Rosario	Canada
2011	Maicon Santos	Brazil
2011–2012	Torsten Frings	Germany
2013	Darren O'Dea	Ireland
2013–2014	Steven Caldwell	Scotland
2015–2023	Michael Bradley	United States
2024–present	Jonathan Osorio	Canada
