= 2024 Toronto FC season =

Toronto FC 2024 soccer season

Toronto FC
2024 season
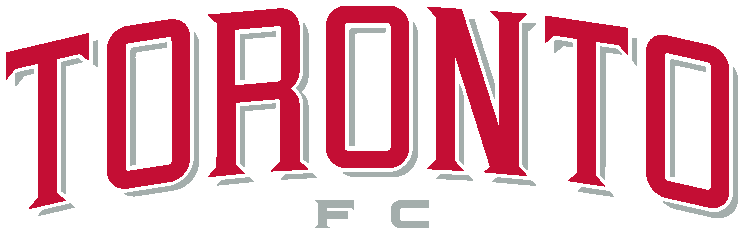
- Owner: Maple Leaf Sports & Entertainment
- President: Bill Manning (until July 11)
- Head coach: John Herdman
- Stadium: BMO Field
- Major League Soccer: Conference: 11th Overall: 22nd
- MLS Cup playoffs: Did not qualify
- Canadian Championship: Runners-up
- Leagues Cup: Round of 32
- Top goalscorer: League: Prince Owusu (9); All: Prince Owusu (12)
- Average home league attendance: 25,681
- Biggest win: TOR 8–1 STL (May 21, CC QF)
- Biggest defeat: VAN 4–0 TOR (April 6); CLB 4–0 TOR (July 6)
Home colours	Away colours

The 2024 Toronto FC season was the 18th season in the history of Toronto FC, and the first full season under head coach John Herdman, who resigned the position in November 2024.

== Squad ==
As of September 17, 2024

No.	Player	Nationality	Position(s)	Date of birth (age)	Signed in	Previous club
Goalkeepers
1	Sean Johnson	(United States)	GK	May 31, 1989 (aged 35)	2023	(United States) New York City FC
18	Greg Ranjitsingh	(Trinidad and Tobago) (Canada)	GK	July 18, 1993 (aged 31)	2022	(United States) MLS Pool
90	Luka Gavran	(Canada)	GK	May 9, 2000 (aged 24)	2023	(Canada) Toronto FC II
Defenders
5	Kevin Long	(Republic of Ireland)	CB	August 18, 1990 (aged 34)	2024	(England) Birmingham City
6	Aimé Mabika	(Zambia) (United States)	CB	October 16, 1998 (aged 26)	2023	(United States) Inter Miami CF
15	Nicksoen Gomis	(France)	LB	March 15, 2002 (aged 22)	2024	(England) Sheffield United
17	Sigurd Rosted	(Norway)	CB	July 22, 1994 (aged 30)	2023	(Denmark) Brøndby
19	Kobe Franklin	(Canada)	RB	May 10, 2003 (aged 21)	2023	(Canada) Toronto FC II
22	Richie Laryea	(Canada)	RB	January 7, 1995 (aged 29)	2024	(England) Nottingham Forest
26	Luke Singh (loaned out)	(Trinidad and Tobago) (Canada)	CB	September 12, 2000 (aged 24)	2021	(Canada) Toronto FC II
27	Shane O'Neill	(United States) (Republic of Ireland)	CB	September 2, 1993 (aged 31)	2022	(United States) Seattle Sounders FC
28	Raoul Petretta	(Italy) (Germany)	LB	March 24, 1997 (aged 27)	2023	(Turkey) Kasımpaşa
30	Henry Wingo	(United States)	RB / CB	October 4, 1995 (aged 29)	2024	(Hungary) Ferencváros
51	Adam Pearlman	(Canada) (South Africa)	CB	April 5, 2005 (aged 19)	2024	(Canada) Toronto FC II
51	Nathaniel Edwards	(Canada)	LB	October 18, 2002 (aged 22)	2024	(Canada) Toronto FC II
Midfielders
8	Matty Longstaff	(England)	MF	March 21, 2000 (aged 24)	2024	(England) Newcastle United
14	Alonso Coello	(Spain)	MF	October 12, 1999 (aged 25)	2023	(Canada) Toronto FC II
20	Deiby Flores	(Honduras)	MF	June 16, 1996 (aged 28)	2024	(Hungary) Fehérvár
21	Jonathan Osorio	(Canada)	AM / CM	June 12, 1992 (aged 32)	2013	(Canada) SC Toronto
23	Brandon Servania	(United States)	MF	March 12, 1999 (aged 25)	2023	(United States) FC Dallas
47	Kosi Thompson	(Canada)	MF	January 27, 2003 (aged 21)	2022	(Canada) Toronto FC II
Forwards
10	Federico Bernardeschi	(Italy)	RW	February 16, 1994 (aged 30)	2022	(Italy) Juventus
11	Derrick Etienne Jr.	(Haiti) (United States)	FW	November 25, 1996 (aged 28)	2024	(United States) Atlanta United FC
12	Cassius Mailula (loaned out)	(South Africa)	FW	June 12, 2001 (aged 23)	2023	(South Africa) Mamelodi Sundowns
16	Tyrese Spicer	(Trinidad and Tobago)	FW	December 4, 2000 (aged 24)	2023	(United States) Lipscomb Bisons
24	Lorenzo Insigne	(Italy)	LW	June 4, 1991 (aged 33)	2022	(Italy) Napoli
29	Deandre Kerr	(Canada)	FW	November 29, 2002 (aged 22)	2022	(United States) Syracuse Orange
38	Charlie Sharp	(Canada)	FW	June 23, 2001 (aged 23)	2024	(Canada) Toronto FC II
83	Hugo Mbongue (loaned out)	(Canada)	FW	July 27, 2004 (aged 20)	2022	(Canada) Toronto FC II
99	Prince Owusu	(Germany)	FW	January 7, 1997 (aged 27)	2023	(Germany) Jahn Regensburg

Players no longer on roster

No.	Player	Nationality	Position(s)	Date of birth (age)	Departure	Next club
11	Latif Blessing	(Ghana)	MF	December 30, 1996 (aged 27)	Traded	(United States) Houston Dynamo FC
79	Andrei Dumitru	(Canada)	MF	October 28, 2006 (aged 18)	Short-term loan	(Canada) Toronto FC II
73	Jesús Batiz	(Honduras)	FW	June 14, 1999 (aged 25)	Short-term loan	(Canada) Toronto FC II
9	Ayo Akinola	(Canada) (United States)	ST	January 20, 2000 (aged 24)	Mutual termination	(Switzerland) Wil
38	Charlie Sharp	(United States)	FW	June 23, 2001 (aged 23)	Short-term loan	(Canada) Toronto FC II
89	Charlie Staniland	(England)	MF	November 12, 2004 (aged 20)	Short-term loan	(Canada) Toronto FC II
77	Jordan Perruzza	(Canada)	FW	January 16, 2001 (aged 23)	Waived	
65	Antony Ćurić	(Canada)	DF	January 16, 2001 (aged 23)	Short-term loan	(Canada) Toronto FC II
95	Nathaniel Edwards	(Canada)	DF	October 18, 2002 (aged 22)	Short-term loan	(Canada) Toronto FC II
71	Markus Cimermancic	(Canada)	MF	October 1, 2004 (aged 20)	Short-term loan	(Canada) Toronto FC II
81	Hassan Ayari	(Tunisia) (United States)	MF	December 8, 2002 (aged 22)	Short-term loan	(Canada) Toronto FC II
82	Julian Altobelli	(Canada)	FW	November 4, 2002 (aged 22)	Short-term loan	(Canada) Toronto FC II
7	Jahkeele Marshall-Rutty	(Canada)	MF / RB	June 16, 2004 (aged 20)	Traded	(Canada) CF Montréal

=== Roster slots ===
Toronto was allocated 8+3 international roster slots and three Designated Player slots available for use in the 2024 season. Beginning in 2022, MLS added three non-tradeable international roster spots to the Canadian franchises to compensate for the more complicated residency requirements compared to in the United States; players occupying these additional roster spots were required to have played and been registered with a Canadian MLS club for at least one full year. In February 2024, they acquired an additional international roster slot from CF Montréal in exchange for $50,000 in GAM in 2024 and $125,000 in GAM in 2025. Later in February 2024, they acquired another international roster slot from FC Cincinnati in exchange for $25,000 in 2024 GAM and $150,000 in 2025 GAM.

International slots
Slot	Player	Nationality
E1	Federico Bernardeschi	Italy
E2	Lorenzo Insigne	Italy
E3	Raoul Petretta	Italy
R1	Alonso Coello	Spain
R2	Deiby Flores	Honduras
R3	Nicksoen Gomis	France
R4	Kevin Long	Ireland
R5	Matty Longstaff	England
R6	Cassius Mailula	South Africa
R7	Prince Owusu	Germany
R8	Sigurd Rosted	Norway
MON	Tyrese Spicer	Trinidad & Tobago
CIN		

Designated Player slots
Slot	Player
1	(Italy) Federico Bernardeschi
2	(Italy) Lorenzo Insigne
3	(Canada) Richie Laryea

U22 Initiative slots
Slot	Player
1	(South Africa) Cassius Mailula
2	
3	

== Transfers ==
Note: All figures in United States dollars.

=== In ===
==== Transferred in ====
No.	Pos.	Player	From	Fee/notes	Date	Source
16	FW	(Trinidad and Tobago) Tyrese Spicer	(United States) Lipscomb Bisons	Selected in 2024 MLS SuperDraft	December 19, 2023	
20	MF	(Honduras) Deiby Flores	(Hungary) Fehérvár	Signed	January 9, 2024	
5	DF	(Republic of Ireland) Kevin Long	(England) Birmingham City	Transfer, undisclosed fee	February 20, 2024	
22	DF	(Canada) Richie Laryea	(England) Nottingham Forest	Transfer, $750,000 fee	February 23, 2024	
15	DF	(France) Nicksoen Gomis	(England) Sheffield United	Transfer, undisclosed fee	February 23, 2024	
51	DF	(Canada) Adam Pearlman	(Canada) Toronto FC II	Homegrown signing	February 24, 2024	
8	MF	(England) Matty Longstaff	Free agent		February 29, 2024	
11	FW	(Haiti) Derrick Etienne Jr.	(United States) Atlanta United FC	Traded in exchange $200,000 in 2025 GAM and $175,000 conditional GAM	April 24, 2024	
30	DF	(United States) Henry Wingo	Free agent	Acquired Discovery Rights in trade with D.C. United for $75,000 in 2025 GAM	July 18, 2024	
95	DF	(Canada) Nathaniel Edwards	(Canada) Toronto FC II	Signed from second team	September 17, 2024	
38	FW	(United States) Charlie Sharp	(Canada) Toronto FC II	Signed from second team	September 17, 2024	

==== Loaned in ====
No.	Pos.	Player	From	Fee/notes	Date	Source
79	MF	(Canada) Andrei Dumitru	(Canada) Toronto FC II	Short-term loans (April 13, April 20, April 24, May 21)	April 13, 2024	
73	FW	(Honduras) Jesús Batiz	(Canada) Toronto FC II	Short-term loans (April 24, May 4, May 8, May 15)	April 24, 2024	
38	FW	(United States) Charlie Sharp	(Canada) Toronto FC II	Short-term loans (May 15, May 29, August 24)	May 15, 2024	
89	MF	(England) Charlie Staniland	(Canada) Toronto FC II	Short-term loans (May 15, May 18, June 19, June 22)	May 15, 2024	
65	DF	(Canada) Antony Ćurić	(Canada) Toronto FC II	Short-term loan	May 21, 2024	
95	DF	(Canada) Nathaniel Edwards	(Canada) Toronto FC II	Short-term loans (May 21, July 3, July 6)	May 21, 2024	
71	MF	(Canada) Markus Cimermancic	(Canada) Toronto FC II	Short-term loans (June 15, June 29, July 3, July 6)	June 15, 2024	
81	MF	(Tunisia) Hassan Ayari	(Canada) Toronto FC II	Short-term loan	June 15, 2024	
82	FW	(Canada) Julian Altobelli	(Canada) Toronto FC II	Short-term loans (July 13, August 4, August 8)	July 13, 2024	

==== MLS SuperDraft picks ====
2024 Toronto FC SuperDraft Picks
Round	Selection	Player	Position	College	Status
1	1	(Trinidad and Tobago) Tyrese Spicer	Forward	Lipscomb Bisons	Signed
2	30	(United States) Joey Maher	Defender	Indiana Hoosiers	Remained at college; transferred to Saint Louis University
3	59	(United States) Patrick McDonald	Midfielder	Indiana Hoosiers	Remained at college
3	85	(United States) Fletcher Bank	Midfielder	Stanford Cardinal	Remained at college

=== Out ===
==== Transferred out ====
No.	Pos.	Player	To	Fee/notes	Date	Source
4	MF	(United States) Michael Bradley	Retired	Retired. Club used buy-out on contract.	October 22, 2023	
30	GK	(El Salvador) Tomás Romero	(United States) New York City FC	Option declined	November 2, 2022	
81	DF	(Canada) Themi Antonoglou	(Canada) Valour FC	Option declined	November 2, 2022	
8	MF	(Spain) Víctor Vázquez	(India) East Bengal	Option declined	November 2, 2022	
9	FW	(United States) C. J. Sapong	Retired	Option declined	November 2, 2022	
3	DF	(Canada) Cristián Gutiérrez	(Chile) Universidad de Concepción	Contract expired	November 2, 2022	
99	FW	(Norway) Adama Diomande	(Norway) KFUM Oslo	Waived	February 23, 2024	
11	MF	(Ghana) Latif Blessing	(United States) Houston Dynamo FC	Traded for $75,000 in 2025 GAM and $200,000 2025 conditional GAM	March 14, 2024	
9	FW	(Canada) Ayo Akinola	(Switzerland) Wil	Mutual termination	May 7, 2024	
77	FW	(Canada) Jordan Perruzza	(United States) Real Monarchs	Waived	May 20, 2024	
7	MF	(Canada) Jahkeele Marshall-Rutty	(Canada) CF Montréal	Traded in exchange for $850,000 GAM and $450,000 conditional GAM	August 8, 2024	

==== Loaned out ====
No.	Pos.	Player	To	Fee/notes	Date	Source
83	FW	(Canada) Hugo Mbongue	(United States) San Antonio FC	Full-year loan	March 5, 2024	
26	DF	(Trinidad and Tobago) Luke Singh	(Canada) Atlético Ottawa	Full-year loan	March 22, 2024	
12	FW	(South Africa) Cassius Mailula	(Morocco) Wydad AC	Loan to July 31, 2025	August 21, 2024	

== Pre-season ==
=== Matches ===
February 2 (Match 1) Friendly	Nashville SC	0–2	Toronto FC	Palm Beach Gardens, Florida
11:00 AM		Report	Bernardeschi; Insigne
Note: Match was played as 2 30-minute halves

February 2 (Match 2) Friendly	Nashville SC	1–0	Toronto FC	Palm Beach Gardens, Florida
12:30 PM EST	Ajago	Report
Note: Match was played as 2 30-minute halves

February 10 Friendly	Columbus Crew	4–2	Toronto FC	Santa Barbara, California
	Goal	Report	Coello; Akinola
Note: Match details agreed not to be published by the clubs. Score later found out to be 4-2. Match was played as a 90-minute match with an additional 30 minute period afterwards.

February 14 Friendly	Real Salt Lake	1–1	Toronto FC	Santa Barbara, California
	Goal	Report	Bernardeschi

February 17 Friendly	Los Angeles FC	1–0	Toronto FC	Santa Barbara, California
	Mabika (o.g.)	Report

== Competitions ==
=== Major League Soccer ===
==== League tables ====
Eastern Conference

MLS Eastern Conference table (2024)
Pos	Team	Pld	Pts
9	Atlanta United FC	34	40
10	D.C. United	34	40
11	Toronto FC	34	37
12	Philadelphia Union	34	37
13	Nashville SC	34	36

Source: MLS

Overall

Overall MLS standings table
Pos	Team	Pld	Pts
20	Atlanta United FC	34	40
21	D.C. United	34	40
22	Toronto FC	34	37
23	Philadelphia Union	34	37
24	St. Louis City SC	34	37

Source: MLS

==== Matches ====
February 25 1	FC Cincinnati	0–0	Toronto FC	Cincinnati, Ohio
2:30 PM	Kubo (yellow card) 63'	Report	Osorio (yellow card) 2'; Petretta (yellow card) 34'; O'Neill (yellow card) 54'; Johnson (yellow card) 82'	Stadium: TQL Stadium; Attendance: 25,513; Referee: Jonathan Weiner

March 3 2	New England Revolution	0–1	Toronto FC	Foxborough, Massachusetts
2:00 PM		Report	Insigne 27'; Bernardeschi (yellow card) 73'; Gomis (yellow card) 82'; Johnson (yellow card) 87'; Akinola (yellow card) 90+3'	Stadium: Gillette Stadium; Attendance: 29,293; Referee: Wesley Costa

March 9 3	Toronto FC	1–0	Charlotte FC	Toronto, Ontario
2:00 PM	Insigne (yellow card) 27', (goal) 80'; Rosted (yellow card) 64'	Report	Vargas (yellow card) 60'; Arfield (yellow card) 82'; Dejaegere (yellow card) 86'; Kahlina (yellow card) 90+5'	Stadium: BMO Field; Attendance: 26,345; Referee: Chris Grabas

March 16 4	New York City FC	2–1	Toronto FC	New York City, New York
7:30 PM	Rodríguez 24'; Risa (yellow card) 42'; Parks (yellow card) 63', (red card) 68'; O'Toole 65'; Haak (yellow card) 90+3'; Sands (yellow card) 90+5'	Report	Marshall-Rutty 7'; Long (yellow card) 23'; Bernardeschi (yellow card) 28'; O'Neill (yellow card) 72'; Insigne (yellow card) 90+7'; Thompson (yellow card) 90+7'	Stadium: Yankee Stadium; Attendance: 18,623; Referee: Muhammad Hassan

March 23 5	Toronto FC	2–0	Atlanta United FC	Toronto, Ontario
7:30 PM	Long (yellow card) 30'; Spicer 35'; Owusu 71'	Report		Stadium: BMO Field; Attendance: 25,768; Referee: Scott Bowman

March 30 6	Toronto FC	1–3	Sporting Kansas City	Toronto, Ontario
7:30 PM	Coello (yellow card) 57'; Osorio (yellow card) 85', (goal) 90+7'	Report	Davis (yellow card) 44', (goal) 64'; Walter 57'; Leibold (yellow card) 71'; Vargas 83'	Stadium: BMO Field; Attendance: 24,382; Referee: Guido Gonzales Jr.

April 6 7	Vancouver Whitecaps FC	4–0	Toronto FC	Vancouver, British Columbia
7:30 PM	White 6'; Picault 29'; Cubas (yellow card) 53'; Gauld 81'; Schöpf (yellow card) 83'; Veselinović 89'	Report	Spicer (yellow card) 45'; Flores (yellow card) 54'; Coello (yellow card) 69'; Long (yellow card) 78'; Bernardeschi (yellow card) 90+6'	Stadium: BC Place; Attendance: 24,678; Referee: Ramy Touchan

April 13 8	Charlotte FC	3–2	Toronto FC	Charlotte, North Carolina
7:30 PM	Vargas 39'; Abada 70', (yellow card) 74'; Agyemang 85'; Lindsey (yellow card) 87'	Report	Owusu 49', 78'; Coello (yellow card) 54'; Osorio (yellow card) 58'; Long (yellow card) 84' (yellow-red card) 90+8'	Stadium: Bank of America Stadium; Attendance: 31,414; Referee: Allen Chapman

April 20 9	Toronto FC	1–0	New England Revolution	Toronto, Ontario
7:30 PM	Petretta (yellow card) 8'; Osorio (yellow card) 43'; Longstaff (yellow card) 65'; Owusu 66'; Bernardeschi (penalty missed) 76'	Report	N. Gil (yellow card) 30'; Polster (yellow card) 42'	Stadium: BMO Field; Attendance: 24,108; Referee: Mark Allatin

April 27 10	Orlando City SC	1–2	Toronto FC	Orlando, Florida
7:30 PM	McGuire 37', (yellow card) 55'; Araújo (yellow card) 67'; Lodeiro (yellow card) 75'; Schlegel (yellow card) 81'	Report	Gomis (yellow card) 11'; Owusu (yellow card) 50', (goal) 90'; Petretta (yellow card) 57'; Spicer 87'; Johnson (yellow card) 90+3'	Stadium: Inter&Co Stadium; Attendance: 21,689; Referee: Armando Villarreal

May 4 11	Toronto FC	3–1	FC Dallas	Toronto, Ontario
7:30 PM	Bernardeschi (penalty missed) 45+3', 45+3', 52'; Gomis (yellow card) 72'; Longstaff 82'; Rosted (yellow card) 90+6'	Report	Musa (yellow card) 9'; Twumasi (yellow card) 67'; Junqua 87'	Stadium: BMO Field; Attendance: 24,257; Referee: Pierre-Luc Lauzière

May 11 12	Toronto FC	2–3	New York City FC	Toronto, Ontario
7:30 PM	Bernardeschi (yellow card) 22' (yellow-red card) 90+10', (goal) 55'; Rosted (yellow card) 36'; Long (yellow card) 53'; Petretta 89'; Owusu (red card) 90+10'	Report	Rodríguez 23' (pen.); Martínez (yellow card) 29'; Jones 44', (yellow card) 50'; Perea 78', (yellow card) 90+9'; Tanasijević (red card) 90+10'	Stadium: BMO Field; Attendance: 26,925; Referee: Lukasz Szpala

May 15 13	Nashville SC	2–0	Toronto FC	Nashville, Tennessee
8:30 PM	Yearwood (yellow card) 36'; Moore 81'; Boyd (yellow card) 86'; Bunbury 90+1'	Report	Thompson (yellow card) 60'	Stadium: Geodis Park; Attendance: 27,868; Referee: Marcos de Oliveira

May 18 14	Toronto FC	5–1	CF Montréal	Toronto, Ontario
7:30 PM	Longstaff 6'; Bernardeschi 12', 58', 60', (yellow card) 90+1'; Owusu 19'	Report	Ibrahim 67'	Stadium: BMO Field; Attendance: 28,261; Referee: Allen Chapman

May 25 15	Toronto FC	3–4	FC Cincinnati	Toronto, Ontario
7:30 PM	Flores 25', (yellow card) 33'; Longstaff (yellow card) 60'; Murphy 63' (o.g.); Long (yellow card) 78'; Insigne 85' (pen.), (yellow card) 90+8'	Report	Orellano 53', 79', (yellow card) 60'; Kelsy 55', (yellow card) 90+10'; Robinson (yellow card) 83'; Santos 90+3'	Stadium: BMO Field; Attendance: 27,941; Referee: Victor Rivas

May 29 16	Philadelphia Union	0–0	Toronto FC	Chester, Pennsylvania
7:30 PM	Bedoya (yellow card) 25'	Report	Longstaff (yellow card) 87'; Spicer (yellow card) 90+3'	Stadium: Subaru Park; Attendance: 18,535; Referee: Rubiel Vazquez

June 1 17	D.C. United	2–2	Toronto FC	Washington, D.C.
7:30 PM	Ku-DiPietro 79'; Klich 90+5' (pen.)	Report	Etienne 2'; Bernardeschi (yellow card) 52' (yellow-red card) 87', (goal) 33'; Gomis (yellow card) 80' (yellow-red card) 90+3'; Flores (yellow card) 82'; Osorio (yellow card) 90+4'; Marshall Rutty (yellow card) 90+4'; Longstaff (yellow card) 90+8'; Petretta (yellow card) 90+12'	Stadium: Audi Field; Attendance: 19,215; Referee: Jon Freemon

June 15 18	Toronto FC	1–4	Chicago Fire FC	Toronto, Ontario
7:30 PM	Insigne 44'	Report	Haile-Selassie 41'; Cuypers 57'; Pineda 60'; Arigoni 89'	Stadium: BMO Field; Attendance: 28,303; Referee: Pierre-Luc Lauzière

June 19 19	Toronto FC	1–2	Nashville SC	Toronto, Ontario
7:30 PM	Bernardeschi (penalty missed) 31'; Coello 34'; Flores (yellow card) 71'; Long (yellow card) 72'	Report	Surridge 65', 90'; Mukhtar (yellow card) 71'	Stadium: BMO Field; Attendance: 23,361; Referee: Chris Penso

June 22 20	New York Red Bulls	3–0	Toronto FC	Harrison, New Jersey
7:30 PM	Elias 30'; Gjengaar 47'; Edelman (yellow card) 68'; Harper 75'; Eile (yellow card) 90+2'	Report	Longstaff (yellow card) 54'; Flores (yellow card) 87'	Stadium: Red Bull Arena; Attendance: 18,039; Referee: Joe Dickerson

June 29 21	Atlanta United FC	2–1	Toronto FC	Atlanta, Georgia
7:30 PM	Almada 45+2'; Fortune (yellow card) 48'; Gregersen (yellow card) 72'; Thiaré 90+7'	Report	Bernardeschi 46'; Long (yellow card) 52'	Stadium: Mercedes-Benz Stadium; Attendance: 42,568; Referee: Marcos de Oliveira

July 3 22	Toronto FC	1–2	Orlando City SC	Toronto, Ontario
7:30 PM	Etienne 5'; Petretta (yellow card) 63'; Flores (yellow card) 71'; O'Neill (yellow card) 75'; Insigne (yellow card) 90+5'	Report	Ojeda 27'; Gomis 45' (o.g.); Cartagena (yellow card) 75'; Gallese (yellow card) 80'; Enrique (yellow card) 88'	Stadium: BMO Field; Attendance: 23,877; Referee: Mark Allatin

July 6 23	Columbus Crew	4–0	Toronto FC	Columbus, Ohio
7:30 PM	Hernández 15'; Ramirez 52'; Nagbe (yellow card) 72'; Farsi 81'; Rossi 85'	Report	Bernardeschi (yellow card) 45+8'; Etienne (yellow card) 67'; Franklin (yellow card) 86'; Thompson (yellow card) 90'	Stadium: Lower.com Field; Attendance: 20,547; Referee: Ted Unkel

July 13 24	Toronto FC	2–1	Philadelphia Union	Toronto, Ontario
7:30 PM	Elliott 74' (o.g.); Kerr 78'	Report	Baribo 39'; Sullivan (yellow card) 77'	Stadium: BMO Field; Attendance: 25,880; Referee: Allen Chapman

July 17 25	Inter Miami CF	3–1	Toronto FC	Fort Lauderdale, Florida
7:30 PM	Gómez 43'; Redondo 53', 59', (yellow card) 62'; Fray (yellow card) 87'	Report	Etienne (yellow card) 52', (goal) 80'	Stadium: Chase Stadium; Attendance: 20,120; Referee: Jair Marrufo

July 20 26	CF Montréal	0–1	Toronto FC	Montreal, Quebec
7:30 PM	Lassiter (yellow card) 30'	Report	Laryea 38', (yellow card) 74'; O'Neill (yellow card) 53'; Petretta (yellow card) 85'	Stadium: Saputo Stadium; Attendance: 19,619; Referee: Armando Villarreal

August 24 27	Houston Dynamo FC	0–1	Toronto FC	Houston, Texas
8:30 PM	Kowalczyk (yellow card) 78'	Report	Osorio (yellow card) 5'; Flores (yellow card) 45'; Owusu 54'; Bernardeschi (yellow card) 60'	Stadium: Shell Energy Stadium; Attendance: 16,640; Referee: Ted Unkel

August 31 28	Toronto FC	1–3	D.C. United	Toronto, Ontario
7:30 PM	Flores (yellow card) 65'; Kerr (yellow card) 77', (goal) 83'; Laryea (yellow card) 90+1'	Report	Rodríguez 67'; Badji 88'; Pirani (yellow card) 90+1', (goal) 90+3'	Stadium: BMO Field; Attendance: 28,489; Referee: Marcos de Oliveira

September 14 29	Toronto FC	2–1	Austin FC	Toronto, Ontario
7:30 PM	Osorio 7'; Kerr 30'; Laryea (yellow card) 63'; O'Neill (yellow card) 70'; Johnson (yellow card) 73'; Thompson (yellow card) 77'; Mabika (yellow card) 83'	Report	Hines-Ike (yellow card) 5'; Driussi (yellow card) 22'; Valencia (yellow card) 54'; Wolff 75'	Stadium: BMO Field; Attendance: 25,538; Referee: Chris Penso

September 18 30	Toronto FC	0–2	Columbus Crew	Toronto, Ontario
7:30 PM	Bernardeschi (yellow card) 78'; Laryea (yellow card) 78'	Report	Hernández 51'; Herrera 70'; Jones (yellow card) 85'; Mățan (yellow card) 90'	Stadium: BMO Field; Attendance: 21,355; Referee: Guido Gonzales Jr.

September 21 31	Colorado Rapids	2–0	Toronto FC	Commerce City, Colorado
9:30 PM	Larraz (yellow card) 23'; Cannon 52'; Rosenberry (yellow card) 81'; Mihailovic 90+1' (pen.)	Report	Owusu (yellow card) 37'; O'Neill (yellow card) 43'; Flores (yellow card) 70'; Mabika (yellow card) 89'; Kerr (yellow card) 90+4'	Stadium: Dick's Sporting Goods Park; Attendance: 15,896; Referee: Rosendo Mendoza

September 28 32	Chicago Fire FC	1–1	Toronto FC	Bridgeview, Illinois
8:30 PM	Giménez (yellow card) 17'; Acosta (yellow card) 58'; Dean 84'; Czichos (yellow card) 90+1'; Omsberg (yellow card) 90+3'	Report	Owusu 45+4' (pen.); Osorio (yellow card) 45+11'; O'Neill (yellow card) 60'; Johnson (yellow card) 83'	Stadium: SeatGeek Stadium; Attendance: 16,097; Referee: Ricardo Montero

October 2 33	Toronto FC	1–4	New York Red Bulls	Toronto, Ontario
7:30 PM	Osorio (yellow card) 30'; Bernardeschi (yellow card) 43' (yellow-red card) 75'; Owusu 66' (pen.); Thompson (yellow card) 80'	Report	Meara (yellow card) 23'; Forsberg 27' (pen.); Reyes (yellow card) 38'; Tolkin 48'; Morgan 69' (pen.); Elias 88'	Stadium: BMO Field; Attendance: 21,575; Referee: Filip Dujic

October 5 34	Toronto FC	0–1	Inter Miami CF	Toronto, Ontario
4:00 PM	Longstaff (yellow card) 55'; Coello (yellow card) 77'; Rosted (yellow card) 79'	Report	Campana 90+3'	Stadium: BMO Field; Attendance: 30,217; Referee: Joe Dickerson

=== Canadian Championship ===
April 24 Preliminary round	Toronto FC	5–0	Simcoe County Rovers FC	Toronto, Ontario
7:30 PM	Thompson (yellow card) 13'; Owusu 18'; Mailula 30'; Long 33'; Osorio 39'; Spicer 76'	Report	Barclay (yellow card) 27'	Stadium: BMO Field; Attendance: 11,430; Referee: Michael Venne

May 8 Quarter-finals; First leg	CS Saint-Laurent	0–3	Toronto FC	Montreal, Quebec
7:00 PM	Mlah (yellow card) 66'	Report	Longstaff 50'; Kerr 59'; Bernardeschi 76'	Stadium: Complexe sportif Claude-Robillard; Attendance: 6,482; Referee: Michael Venne

May 21 Quarter-finals; Second leg	Toronto FC	8–1 (11–1 agg.)	CS Saint-Laurent	Toronto, Ontario
7:00 PM	Kerr 12', 14', 43', 72'; Marshall-Rutty (yellow card) 32'; Mailula 50'; Etienne 56' (pen.); Goulet 62' (o.g.); Owusu 80'	Report	Boughanmi (red card) 45'; Kwemi (yellow card) 64'; Aristilde 89'	Stadium: BMO Field; Attendance: 9,148; Referee: Yusri Rudolf

July 10 Semi-finals; First leg	Forge FC	2–1	Toronto FC	Hamilton, Ontario
7:00 PM	Badibanga 11'; Poku 14'	Report	Insigne (yellow card) 66'; Owusu 88'; Long (yellow card) 90+3'	Stadium: Tim Hortons Field; Attendance: 11,341; Referee: Ben Hoskins

August 27 Semi-finals; Second leg	Toronto FC	1–0 (2 (a) –2 agg.)	Forge FC	Toronto, Ontario
7:00 PM	Insigne (yellow card) 38', (goal) 50'; Etienne (yellow card) 67'; Wingo (yellow card) 67'; Franklin (yellow card) 85'	Report	Choinière (yellow card) 65'; Achinioti-Jönsson (yellow card) 88'	Stadium: BMO Field; Attendance: 20,173; Referee: Renzo Villanueva

September 25 Final	Vancouver Whitecaps FC	0–0 (4–2 p)	Toronto FC	Vancouver, British Columbia
10:00 PM	Picault (yellow card) 15'; Laborda (yellow card) 53'; White (yellow card) 90+3'	Report	Bernardeschi (penalty missed) 38'; Kerr (yellow card) 45+1'	Stadium: BC Place; Attendance: 12,516; Referee: Marie-Soleil Beaudoin
	Penalties
	Gauld (penalty scored); Armstrong (penalty missed); Berhalter (penalty scored); White (penalty scored); Utvik (penalty scored)		(penalty scored) Owusu; (penalty missed) Longstaff; (penalty missed) Thompson; (penalty scored) Osorio

=== Leagues Cup ===
==== Group stage ====
Pos	Team	Pld	W	PW	PL	L	GF	GA	GD	Pts	Qualification	TOR	PAC	NYR
1	(Canadian Soccer Association) Toronto FC	2	1	1	0	0	2	1	+1	5	Advance to knockout stage	—	—	—
2	(Mexican Football Federation) Pachuca	2	0	1	0	1	2	3	−1	2	Advance to knockout stage	1–2	—	1–1
3	(United States Soccer Federation) New York Red Bulls	2	0	0	2	0	1	1	0	2		0–0	—	—

Source: Leagues Cup
Rules for classification: Tiebreakers

July 27 1	New York Red Bulls (United States)	0–0 (4–5 p)	(Canada) Toronto FC	Harrison, New Jersey
8:00 PM		Report	Gomis (yellow card) 25'	Stadium: Red Bull Arena; Attendance: 10,958; Referee: Víctor Cáceres (Mexico)
	Penalties
	Morgan (penalty scored); Vanzeir (penalty scored); Carmona (penalty scored); Elias (penalty scored); Burke (penalty missed); Edelman (penalty missed); Reyes (penalty missed)		(penalty missed) Insigne; (penalty scored) Longstaff; (penalty scored) Thompson; (penalty scored) Etienne; (penalty scored) Osorio; (penalty missed) Marshall-Rutty; (penalty scored) O'Neill

August 4 2	Pachuca (Mexico)	1–2	(Canada) Toronto FC	Toronto, Ontario
8:00 PM	Saldívar (yellow card) 5'; Idrissi 59'; Barreto (yellow card) 90+3'	Report	Etienne 44'; Gomis (yellow card) 59'; Franklin 78'; Owusu (yellow card) 90+2'; Longstaff (yellow card) 90+4'	Stadium: BMO Field; Attendance: 24,202; Referee: Joe Dickerson (United States)

==== Knockout stage ====
August 8 Round of 32	Inter Miami CF (United States)	4–3	(Canada) Toronto FC	Fort Lauderdale, Florida
7:30 PM	Rojas 3', 59'; Gómez 11'; Suárez 20'; Martínez (red card) 28'; Cremaschi (yellow card) 84'	Report	Insigne 15' (pen.), 41' (pen.); Laryea (yellow card) 43'; Wingo (yellow card) 54'; Allen 79' (o.g.)	Stadium: Chase Stadium; Attendance: 10,543; Referee: Adonai Escobedo (Mexico)

=== Competitions summary ===
Competition	Record								First Match	Last Match	Final Position
Competition	G	W	D	L	GF	GA	GD	Win %	First Match	Last Match	Final Position
MLS Regular Season	34	11	4	19	40	61	−21	32.35	February 25	October 5	11th in Eastern Conference, 22nd Overall
Canadian Championship	6	4	1	1	18	3	+15	66.67	April 24	September 25	Runners-up
Leagues Cup	3	1	1	1	5	5	+0	33.33	July 27	August 8	Round of 32
Total	43	16	6	21	63	69	−6	37.21			

Source: Competitions

== Statistics ==
=== Goals ===
Rank	Nation	Player	Major League Soccer	Canadian Championship	Leagues Cup	Total
1	(Germany)	Prince Owusu	9	3	0	12
2	(Italy)	Federico Bernardeschi	8	1	0	9
3	(Canada)	Deandre Kerr	3	5	0	8
4	(Italy)	Lorenzo Insigne	4	1	2	7
5	(Haiti)	Derrick Etienne Jr.	3	1	1	5
6	(England)	Matty Longstaff	2	1	0	3
6	(Canada)	Jonathan Osorio	2	1	0	3
6	(Trinidad and Tobago)	Tyrese Spicer	2	1	0	3
9	(South Africa)	Cassius Mailula	0	2	0	2
10	(Spain)	Alonso Coello	1	0	0	1
10	(Honduras)	Deiby Flores	1	0	0	1
10	(Canada)	Kobe Franklin	0	0	1	1
10	(Canada)	Richie Laryea	1	0	0	1
10	(Republic of Ireland)	Kevin Long	0	1	0	1
10	(Canada)	Jahkeele Marshall-Rutty	1	0	0	1
10	(Italy)	Raoul Petretta	1	0	0	1
Own goals			2	1	1	4
Totals			40	18	5	63

Source: Toronto FC

Left team during the season
Out on loan for remainder of the season

=== Shutouts ===
Rank	Nation	Player	Major League Soccer	Canadian Championship	Leagues Cup	Total
1	(United States)	Sean Johnson	6	2	1	9
2	(Canada)	Luka Gavran	2	2	0	4
Totals			8	4	1	13

Source: Toronto FC

== Honours ==
=== MLS Team of the Matchday ===
Matchday (Note: Matchday listed refers to Toronto FC's matchday number, not the league-wide number)	Starters	Bench	Coach	Ref.
1	—	(United States) Sean Johnson (Honduras) Deybi Flores	—	
2	(United States) Sean Johnson	(Italy) Lorenzo Insigne	—	
3	(Italy) Lorenzo Insigne	—	—	
5	(Trinidad and Tobago) Tyrese Spicer	—	—	
8	—	(Germany) Prince Owusu	—	
9	(United States) Sean Johnson	—	—	
10	(Italy) Federico Bernardeschi	(Republic of Ireland) Kevin Long	—	
11	(Italy) Federico Bernardeschi	—	—	
14	(Italy) Federico Bernardeschi	(Honduras) Deybi Flores	—	
15	(Italy) Lorenzo Insigne	—	—	
24	—	(Canada) Deandre Kerr	—	
26	(Canada) Richie Laryea	—	—	
29	—	(Canada) Jonathan Osorio	—	

=== MLS Goal of the Matchday ===
Matchday	Player	Opponent	Ref.
2	(Italy) Lorenzo Insigne	New England Revolution	

=== MLS Player of the Matchday ===
Matchday	Player	Opponent	Ref.
14	(Italy) Federico Bernardeschi	CF Montréal	
