= 2024 Toronto FC II season =

Toronto FC II
2024 season
- Owner: Maple Leaf Sports & Entertainment
- Manager: Gianni Cimini
- MLS Next Pro: 12th, East (23rd, overall)
- MLSNP Cup Playoffs: did not qualify
- Top goalscorer: Julian Altobelli (11 goals)

The 2024 Toronto FC II season was the ninth season of play in the club's history and their third season in MLS Next Pro.

== Team roster ==
MLS Next Pro allows for up to 35 players on a roster. Roster slots 1 through 24 are reserved for players on professional contracts. The remaining 11 slots are for amateur MLS Academy players (who are unpaid, must be under the age of 21, be part of the team's academy, and have never signed a professional contract or played in the NCAA).

=== Roster ===
As of September 20, 2024

No.	Pos.	Nation	Player
38	FW	USA	Charlie Sharp
40	GK	CAN	Adisa De Rosario
50	GK	USA	Abraham Rodriguez
58	DF	BRA	Ythallo (on loan from São Paulo FC)
65	DF	CAN	Joses Chukwu
68	MF	CAN	Lucas Olguin
70	MF	CAN	Matthew Catavolo
71	MF	CAN	Markus Cimermancic
72	MF	CAN	Mark Fisher
73	FW	HON	Jesús Batiz
74	DF	CAN	Kundai Mawoko
76	DF	CAN	Lazar Stefanovic
78	MF	CAN	Jourdan Spence
79	MF	CAN	Andrei Dumitru
80	GK	CAN	Shafique Wilson
81	MF	TUN	Hassan Ayari
82	FW	CAN	Julian Altobelli
84	MF	CAN	Philip Igbinobaro
85	MF	CAN	Marko Stojadinovic
86	MF	CAN	Tyler Londono
87	MF	CAN	Costa Iliadis
89	MF	ENG	Charlie Staniland
91	FW	CAN	Dékwon Barrow
92	DF	CAN	Theo Rigopoulos
93	DF	CAN	Pablo Patrick-Galvez
94	MF	CAN	Noah De Blasis
94	DF	CAN	Elijah Roche
95	DF	CAN	Nathaniel Edwards
96	DF	CAN	Richard Chukwu
97	DF	CAN	Tristan Pusztahegyi
98	DF	CAN	Kristjan Fortier
98	DF	CAN	Stefan Kapor

Toronto FC Academy player

First team players who have been loaned to TFC II in 2024
No.	Position	Nation	Player
12	FW	RSA	Cassius Mailula
51	DF	CAN	Adam Pearlman
77	FW	CAN	Jordan Perruzza
23	MF	USA	Brandon Servania

Toronto FC Academy player
No longer on first team roster

Players no longer on roster
No.	Position	Nation	Player
65	DF	CAN	Antony Ćurić
75	MF	CAN	Luca Accettola

== Coaching staff ==
As of November 15, 2022

Coaching staff
Head coach	(Canada) Gianni Cimini
Assistant coach	(Canada) Marco Casalinuovo
Assistant coach	(Canada) Yianni Michelis
Goalkeeping coach	(Canada) David Monsalve

== Transfers ==
Note: All figures in United States dollars.

=== In ===
==== Transferred In ====
No.	Pos.	Player	From	Fee/notes	Date	Source
38	FW	(United States) Charlie Sharp	(United States) Western Michigan Broncos	Signed; 2023 MLS SuperDraft pick	February 15, 2024	
95	DF	(Canada) Nathaniel Edwards	(United States) Syracuse Orange	Signed	February 29, 2024	
72	MF	(United States) Mark Fisher	(United States) Stanford Cardinal	Signed	February 29, 2024	
50	GK	(United States) Abraham Rodriguez	(United States) Colorado Rapids	Signed	March 7, 2024	
80	GK	(Canada) Shafique Wilson	(United States) Albany Great Danes	Signed	March 14, 2024	
81	MF	(Tunisia) Hassan Ayari	(England) Sheffield United U23	Signed	April 18, 2024	
89	MF	(England) Charlie Staniland	(England) Sheffield United U23	Signed	April 18, 2024	
87	MF	(Canada) Costa Iliadis	(Canada) CF Montréal U23	Signed	September 20, 2024	

==== Loaned in ====
No.	Pos.	Player	From	Fee/notes	Date	Source
58	DF	(Brazil) Ythallo	(Brazil) São Paulo U20	One-year loan	March 1, 2024	

=== Out ===
==== Transferred out ====
No.	Pos.	Player	To	Fee/notes	Date	Source
50	GK	(Canada) Gianluca Catalano		Option declined	November 17, 2023	
62	DF	(Canada) Rohan Goulbourne		Option declined	November 17, 2023	
89	DF	(Canada) Matthew Medeiros	(Canada) Vaughan Azzurri	Option declined	November 17, 2023	
38	DF	(Canada) Jalen Watson	(Canada) Simcoe County Rovers FC	Option declined	November 17, 2023	
72	FW	(Canada) Jordan Faria	(Canada) Valour FC	Option declined	November 17, 2023	
51	DF	(Canada) Adam Pearlman	(Canada) Toronto FC	Contract expired	November 17, 2023	
86	FW	(Puerto Rico) Alec Díaz	(United States) Colorado Rapids 2	Contract expired	November 17, 2023	
33	FW	(Canada) Reshaun Walkes	(Canada) Vaughan Azzurri	Contract expired	November 17, 2023	
49	GK	(Canada) Baj Maan	(Canada) Vaughan Azzurri	Contract expired	November 17, 2023	
95	MF	(Canada) Ife Adenuga	(Canada) Sigma FC	Contract expired	November 17, 2023	
65	DF	(Canada) Antony Ćurić	(Slovenia) ND Gorica	Mutual termination	June 19, 2024	
75	MF	(Canada) Luca Accettola	(Canada) York University	Mutual termination	August 22, 2024	
95	DF	(Canada) Nathaniel Edwards	(Canada) Toronto FC	Signed with first team	September 17, 2024	
38	FW	(United States) Charlie Sharp	(Canada) Toronto FC	Signed with first team	September 17, 2024	

==== Loaned out ====
No.	Pos.	Player	To	Fee/notes	Date	Source
79	MF	(Canada) Andrei Dumitru	(Canada) Toronto FC	Short-term loans (April 13, April 20, April 24, May 21)	April 13, 2024	
73	FW	(Honduras) Jesús Batiz	(Canada) Toronto FC	Short-term loans (April 24, May 4, May 8, May 15)	April 24, 2024	
38	FW	(United States) Charlie Sharp	(Canada) Toronto FC	Short-term loans (May 15, May 29, August 24)	May 15, 2024	
89	MF	(England) Charlie Staniland	(Canada) Toronto FC	Short-term loans (May 15, May 18, June 19, June 22)	May 15, 2024	
65	DF	(Canada) Antony Ćurić	(Canada) Toronto FC	Short-term loan	May 21, 2024	
95	DF	(Canada) Nathaniel Edwards	(Canada) Toronto FC	Short-term loans (May 21, July 3, July 6)	May 21, 2024	
71	MF	(Canada) Markus Cimermancic	(Canada) Toronto FC	Short-term loans (June 15, June 29, July 3, July 6)	June 15, 2024	
81	MF	(Tunisia) Hassan Ayari	(Canada) Toronto FC	Short-term loan	June 15, 2024	
82	FW	(Canada) Julian Altobelli	(Canada) Toronto FC	Short-term loans (July 13, August 4, August 8)	July 13, 2024	

== Competitions ==
=== MLS Next Pro ===
==== Standings ====
Eastern Conference

Pos	Div	Team	Pld	W	SOW	SOL	L	GF	GA	GD	Pts
10	SE	Carolina Core FC	28	12	3	1	12	39	45	−6	43
11	NE	New York Red Bulls II	28	10	4	2	12	56	61	−5	40
12	NE	Toronto FC II	28	10	1	5	12	44	51	−7	37
13	SE	Atlanta United 2	28	7	4	3	14	42	64	−22	32
14	SE	Huntsville City FC	28	8	0	5	15	39	53	−14	29

Source: MLSNP Eastern Conference
Rules for classification: 1) points; 2) total wins; 3) total goal differential; 4) total goals scored; 5) fewer disciplinary points; 6) away goal differential; 7) away goals scored; 8) home goals differential; 9) home goals scored; 10) coin toss (2 clubs tied) or drawing of lots (≥3 clubs tied)

Overall table

Pos	Team	Pld	W	SOW	SOL	L	GF	GA	GD	Pts
21	Sporting Kansas City II	28	10	2	4	12	53	57	−4	38
22	Portland Timbers 2	28	8	4	6	10	43	45	−2	38
23	Toronto FC II	28	10	1	5	12	44	51	−7	37
24	Austin FC II	28	7	4	7	10	44	49	−5	36
25	Minnesota United FC 2	28	8	4	0	16	43	73	−30	32

Source: MLSNP
Rules for classification: 1) points; 2) total wins; 3) total goal differential; 4) total goals scored; 5) fewer disciplinary points; 6) away goal differential; 7) away goals scored; 8) home goals differential; 9) home goals scored; 10) coin toss (2 clubs tied) or drawing of lots (≥3 clubs tied)

==== Match results ====
March 17, 2024 1	Philadelphia Union 2	2–1	Toronto FC II	Chester, Pennsylvania
3:00 PM	Westfield 51'; Davis 54'	Report	Batiz 41'	Stadium: Subaru Park; Referee: Thomas Snyder

April 7, 2024 3	Columbus Crew 2	2–1	Toronto FC II	Columbus, Ohio
3:00 PM	Saad 37'; Rincón 45+1'	Report	Perruzza 17'	Stadium: Historic Crew Stadium; Referee: Rebecca Pagan

April 14, 2024 4	Toronto FC II	2–1	FC Cincinnati 2	Toronto, Ontario
2:00 PM	Sharp 12'; Cimermancic 42'	Report	Benalcazar 64' (pen.)	Stadium: York Lions Stadium; Referee: Mario Alayass

April 19, 2024 5	Toronto FC II	1–1 (4–5 SO)	New England Revolution II	Toronto, Ontario
7:00 PM	Altobelli 6'	Report	Marcos Dias 45+1'	Stadium: York Lions Stadium; Referee: Robert D'Alesio
	Shootout
	Ćurić (penalty missed); Catavolo (penalty scored); Ayari (penalty scored); Rigopoulos (penalty missed); Fisher (penalty scored); Ythallo (penalty scored); Stojadinovic (penalty missed)		Marcos Dias (penalty scored); Escobar (penalty missed); Bolma (penalty scored); Souza (penalty scored); Panayotou (penalty missed); Borovic (penalty scored); Pârvu (penalty scored)

April 28, 2024 6	Orlando City B	1–2	Toronto FC II	Kissimmee, Florida
3:00 PM	Rivera 50'	Report	Sharp 9'; Batiz 89'	Stadium: Osceola Heritage Park; Referee: Brad Jensen

May 5, 2024 7	Toronto FC II	1–1 (1–3 SO)	Columbus Crew 2	Toronto, Ontario
3:00 PM	Ayari 16'	Report	Mrowka 52'	Stadium: York Lions Stadium; Referee: Thomas Noel
	Shootout
	Altobelli (penalty scored); Catavolo (penalty missed); Cimermancic (penalty missed); Staniland (penalty missed)		Adams (penalty scored); Presthus (penalty scored); Habroune (penalty scored)

May 10, 2024 8	Huntsville City FC	0–1	Toronto FC II	Huntsville, Alabama
8:00 PM	Wright (red card) 90+6'	Report	Sharp 85'	Stadium: Joe W. Davis Stadium; Attendance: 4,252; Referee: Kevin Fikar

May 23, 2024 10	Toronto FC II	2–1	Carolina Core FC	Toronto, Ontario
7:00 PM	Staniland 14'; Batiz 90+1'	Report	Canete 84' (pen.)	Stadium: York Lions Stadium; Referee: Youcef Boumsied

May 31, 2024 11	Toronto FC II	1–4	Chicago Fire FC II	Toronto, Ontario
7:00 PM	Cimermancic 10'	Report	Batiz 16' (o.g.); Shokalook 26'; Poręba 90+4', 90+6' (pen.)	Stadium: York Lions Stadium; Referee: Fabrizio Stasolla

June 9, 2024 12	New York Red Bulls II	2–1	Toronto FC II	Montclair, New Jersey
7:00 PM	Sofo 43', 61' (pen.)	Report	Sharp 71'	Stadium: MSU Soccer Park at Pittser Field; Referee: Esad Omanovic

June 12, 2024 13	Toronto FC II	1–3	New York City FC II	Toronto, Ontario
7:00 PM	Bednarsky 90+3' (o.g.) Altobelli (red card) 45+3'	Report	Calheira 43', 50'; Lancher 90+1'	Stadium: York Lions Stadium; Referee: Niko Jecanski

June 26, 2024 14	Toronto FC II	2–1	Inter Miami II	Toronto, Ontario
7:00 PM	Boatwright 49' (o.g.); Edwards 53'	Report	Carmichael 11'	Stadium: York Lions Stadium; Referee: Melvin Christopher

June 30, 2024 15	Toronto FC II	0–4	Philadelphia Union II	Toronto, Ontario
3:00 PM		Report	Tucker 8'; Davis 12', 31'; Westfield 20'	Stadium: York Lions Stadium; Referee: Mazzen Black

July 7, 2024 16	Columbus Crew 2	2–2 (7–6 SO)	Toronto FC	Columbus, Ohio
6:00 PM	Adu-Gyamfi 70'; Flanary 88'	Report	Ayari 57'; Altobelli 90+4'	Stadium: Historic Crew Stadium; Referee: Elvis Osmanovic
	Shootout
	Mrwoka (penalty scored); Almeida (penalty scored); Adu-Gyamfi (penalty scored); Da (penalty scored); Presthus (penalty scored); Rincón (penalty scored); Rogers (penalty scored)		Ayari (penalty scored); Altobelli (penalty scored); Ythallo (penalty scored); Fisher (penalty scored); Edwards (penalty scored); De Rosario (penalty scored); Cimermancic (penalty missed)

July 10, 2024 2	Chicago Fire FC II	2–0	Toronto FC II	Bridgeview, Illinois
3:00 PM	Glasgow 47'; Oregel 66'	Report		Stadium: SeatGeek Stadium; Referee: Ryan Farrel
Note: Match originally scheduled for March 22

July 14, 2024 17	Toronto FC II	1–2	FC Cincinnati 2	Toronto, Ontario
3:00 PM	Gibert 75' (o.g.)	Report	Stitz 14'; Chirilla 90'	Stadium: York Lions Stadium; Referee: Myriam Marcotte

July 28, 2024 18	Toronto FC II	4–3	New York Red Bulls II	Toronto, Ontario
3:00 PM	Ayari 12', 57'; Altobelli 39'; Cimermancic 75'	Report	Gutierrez 63'; Sullivan 87'; Rosborough 88'	Stadium: York Lions Stadium; Referee: David Schmidt-Schweda

August 3, 2024 19	Chattanooga FC	1–1 (5–3 SO)	Toronto FC II	Chattanooga, Tennessee
7:00 PM	Ouamri 36'	Report	Accettola 90+2'	Stadium: Finley Stadium; Attendance: 3,769; Referee: Russell Miller
	Shootout
	Garvanian (penalty scored); Kwak (penalty scored); Pérez (penalty scored); Sar-Sar (penalty scored); James (penalty scored)		Ythallo (penalty scored); Fisher (penalty scored); Sharp (penalty scored); Staniland (penalty missed)

August 11, 2024 20	Atlanta United 2	2–1	Toronto FC II	Kennesaw, Georgia
7:30 PM	Moore 27'; Neri 48'	Report	Altobelli 16'	Stadium: Fifth Third Bank Stadium; Referee: Adam Mitchell

August 18, 2024 21	Toronto FC II	4–2	Philadelphia Union II	Toronto, Ontario
3:00 PM	Batiz 13'; Ythallo 22'; Altobelli 60' (pen.); Ayari 76'	Report	LeBlanc 49', 57'	Stadium: York Lions Stadium; Referee: Mo Mohseni

August 25, 2024 22	Toronto FC II	2–3	Huntsville City FC	Toronto, Ontario
3:00 PM	Altobelli 16'; Fisher 45+1'	Report	Sipić 2'; Pacius 51'; Tropeano 82'	Stadium: York Lions Stadium; Referee: Youcef Boumsied

September 1, 2024 23	FC Cincinnati 2	0–2	Toronto FC II	Highland Heights, Kentucky
7:00 PM		Report	Altobelli 4'; Sharp 22'	Stadium: NKU Soccer Stadium; Referee: Joe Surgan

September 8, 2024 24	New England Revolution II	2–2 (6–5 SO)	Toronto FC II	Foxborough, Massachusetts
7:00 PM	Dias 41', 48'		Altobelli 8' (pen.); Staniland 78'	Stadium: Gillette Stadium; Referee: Johnathan Luk
	Shootout
	Dias (penalty scored); Bolma (penalty scored); Klein (penalty missed); Tiago (penalty scored); Souza (penalty scored); Butts (penalty scored); Mussenden (penalty scored)		Ayari (penalty scored); Altobelli (penalty missed); Fisher (penalty scored); Sharp (penalty scored); Dumitru (penalty scored); Catavolo (penalty scored); De Rosario (penalty missed)

September 11 9	New York City FC II	1–1 (3–4 SO)	Toronto FC II	New York City, New York
5:00 PM	Leong 80'	Report	Altobelli 82' (pen.)	Stadium: Belson Stadium; Referee: John Matto
	Shootout
	Elias (penalty missed); Jiménez (penalty scored); Owusu (penalty scored); Rozhansky (penalty scored); Calheira (penalty missed); Leong (penalty missed)		Ayari (penalty scored); Altobelli (penalty scored); Fisher (penalty missed); Dumitru (penalty scored); Edwards (penalty missed); Pearlman (penalty scored)
Note: Originally scheduled for May 17

September 15, 2024 25	Toronto FC II	3–0	New York City FC II	Toronto, Ontario
3:00 PM	Fisher 25'; Altobelli 26'; Ayari 90+1'	Report		Stadium: York Lions Stadium; Referee: Carly Shaw-MacLaren

September 22, 2024 26	New York Red Bulls II	2–0	Toronto FC II	Montclair, New Jersey
5:00 PM	Rosborough 8'; Sofo 54'	Report		Stadium: MSU Soccer Park at Pittser Field; Referee: Emmy Nonso

September 29, 2024 27	Toronto FC II	1–5	Chattanooga FC	Toronto, Ontario
3:00 PM	Cimermancic 60'	Report	Ibarra 35'; Garvanian 62'; Gray 66', 80'; McGrath 70'	Stadium: York Lions Stadium; Referee: Fabrizio Stasolla

October 6, 2024 28	Crown Legacy FC	1–4	Toronto FC II	Matthews, North Carolina
1:00 PM	Sing 28'	Report	Stojadinovic 16'; Altobelli 23' (pen.); Edwards 61'; J.Chukwu 90+1'	Stadium: Sportsplex at Matthews; Referee: JJ Bilinski

== Statistics ==
=== Goals ===
Rank	Nation	Player	MLS Next Pro	Playoffs	Total
1	(Canada)	Julian Altobelli	11	-	11
2	(Tunisia)	Hassan Ayari	6	-	6
3	(United States)	Charlie Sharp	5	-	5
4	(Honduras)	Jesús Batiz	4	-	4
4	(Canada)	Markus Cimermancic	4	-	4
6	(England)	Charlie Staniland	2	-	2
6	(Canada)	Nathaniel Edwards	1	-	1
6	(Canada)	Mark Fisher	2	-	2
8	(Canada)	Luca Accettola	1	-	1
8	(Canada)	Joses Chukwu	1	-	1
8	(Canada)	Jordan Perruzza	1	-	1
8	(Canada)	Marko Stojadinovic	1	-	1
8	(Brazil)	Ythallo	1	-	1
Own goals			3	0	3
Totals			44	0	44

Updated to match played October 6, 2024
Source: Stats Crew

No longer on roster

=== Shutouts ===
Rank	Nation	Player	Pos.	MLS Next Pro	Playoffs	Total
1	(Canada)	Adisa De Rosario	GK	1	-	1
1	(United States)	Abraham Rodriguez	GK	1	-	1
Totals				2	0	2

Updated to match played September 15, 2024
Source: Stats Crew
