= Ythallo =

Brazilian footballer

Personal information
- Full name: Ythallo Rykelm Rodrigues de Oliveira
- Date of birth: 22 July 2004 (age 22)
- Place of birth: São Bernardo do Campo, Brazil
- Height: 6 ft 4 in (1.93 m)
- Position: Defender

Team information
- Current team: Santa Clara
- Number: 19

Youth career
- Mauaense
- 2016–2024: São Paulo

Senior career*
Years	Team	Apps	(Gls)
2024–2025	São Paulo	0	(0)
2024	→ Toronto FC II (loan)	25	(1)
2025	Toronto FC II	25	(0)
2026	Botafogo	5	(0)
2026–	Santa Clara	0	(0)
- * Club domestic league appearances and goals as of 13 September 2026

Ythallo Rykelm Rodrigues de Oliveira (born 22 July 2004) is a Brazilian footballer who plays for Primeira Liga club Santa Clara.

== Early life ==
Ythallo began his youth career with Mauaense, later joining the São Paulo youth system in 2016. He initially joined São Paulo as a striker, before being converted to a defender.

== Club career ==
At the beginning of 2023, he began training with the São Paulo FC first team. In March 2024, Ythallo was loaned to Canadian club Toronto FC II in MLS Next Pro for the 2024 season with an option to purchase. He made his debut for Toronto FC II on 17 March in a match against Philadelphia Union II. He scored his first goal for Toronto FC II on 18 August against Philadelphia Union II. Over the course of the season, he made 25 appearances for the team. At the end of the season, Toronto did not exercise the purchase option and he returned to São Paulo. In February 2025, he departed São Paulo. In February 2025, he returned to Toronto FC II on a permanent contract.

In January 2026, he signed with Botafogo in the Campeonato Brasileiro Série A through 2027.

On 2 September 2026, Ythallo signed a three-year deal with Santa Clara in Portugal.

== International career ==
Ythallo has been called up to both the Brazil U15 and Brazil U17 teams.

== Career statistics ==
As of 28 May 2026

Appearances and goals by club, season and competition
Club	Season	League			State League		National cup		Continental		Other		Total	
Club	Season	Division	Apps	Goals	Apps	Goals	Apps	Goals	Apps	Goals	Apps	Goals	Apps	Goals
São Paulo	2024	Série A	0	0	0	0	0	0	0	0	0	0	0	0
Toronto FC II (loan)	2024	MLS Next Pro	25	1	—		—		—		—		25	1
Toronto FC II	2025	MLS Next Pro	25	0	—		—		—		—		25	0
Toronto FC II	Total		50	1	0	0	0	0	0	0	0	0	50	1
Botafogo	2026	Série A	1	0	4	0	0	0	2 (Note: One appearance in Copa Sudamericana and one appearance in Copa Libertadores)	0	—		7	0
Career total			51	1	4	0	0	0	2	0	0	0	57	1
