= Mark Fisher (soccer) =

Canadian soccer player (born 2000)

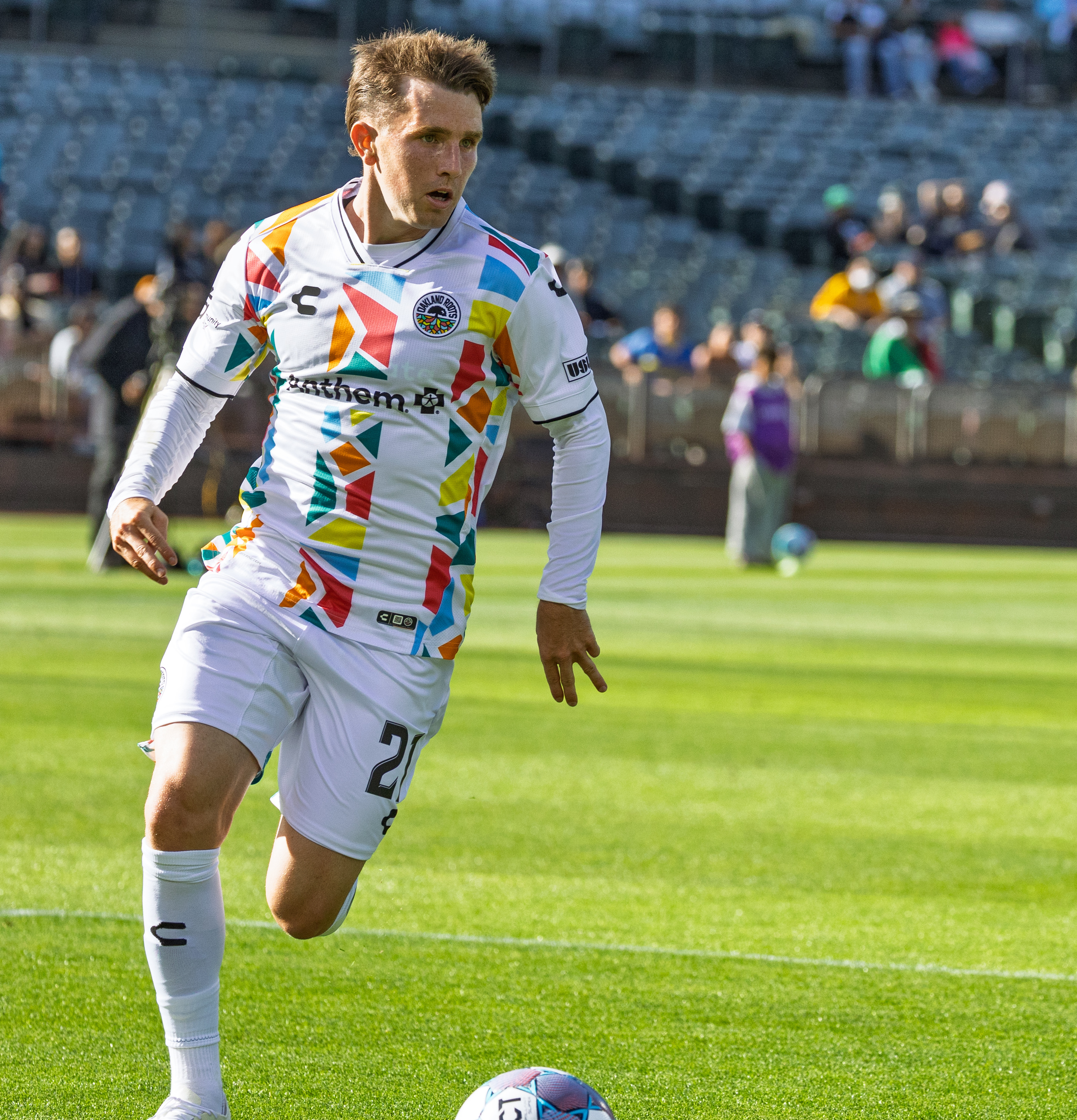
- Fisher with the Oakland Roots in 2026

Personal information
- Full name: Mark Elliot Fisher
- Date of birth: December 14, 2000 (age 25)
- Place of birth: Calgary, Alberta, Canada
- Position: Midfielder

Team information
- Current team: Oakland Roots
- Number: 20

Youth career
- 2015–2016: Waza FC
- 2016–2019: Michigan Wolves

College career
Years	Team	Apps	(Gls)
2020–2023	Stanford Cardinal	62	(5)

Senior career*
Years	Team	Apps	(Gls)
2024–2025	Toronto FC II	39	(3)
2025	→ Toronto FC (loan)	0	(0)
2026–	Oakland Roots	13	(1)
- * Club domestic league appearances and goals as of 10:58, 10 November 2026 (UTC)

Mark Elliot Fisher (born December 14, 2000) is a Canadian soccer player who plays for the Oakland Roots in the USL Championship.

== Early life ==
Fisher was born in Calgary, Alberta in Canada, but grew up in Grand Blanc, Michigan in the United States. He played youth soccer with Waza FC from 2015 to 2016 and Michigan Wolves SC from 2016 to 2019. He attended Grand Blanc High School, where he earned all-conference, all-district and all-region honors for the soccer team.

== College career ==
Fisher began attending Stanford University in 2019, where he played for the men's soccer team. He redshirted his first season. In his freshman season, Fisher was named the Pac-12 Conference Freshman of the Year, and was named to the TopDrawerSoccer Best XI Freshman Second Team, and the College Soccer News All-Freshman First Team. In his senior year, he was named to the All-Pac 12 Second Team, the All-Far West Region First Team, and earned Scholar All-America, and Academic All-American honours. He was also a four-time Pac-12 Academic Honour Roll recipient (2020-2023) and two-time Academic All-District honouree (2022–23).

== Club career ==
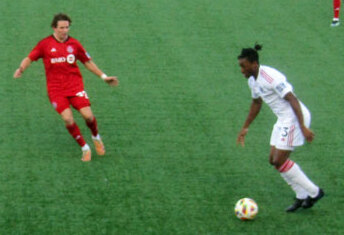
Hesron Barry (white) tries to elude Mark Fisher (red)

In February 2024, he signed a professional contract with Toronto FC II in MLS Next Pro. He made his debut on March 17 in a match against Philadelphia Union II. He scored his first goal on August 25 against Huntsville City FC. Toronto FC II exercised Fisher's contract option following the 2024 season. In June 2025, he signed a short-term loan with the Toronto FC first team.

In January 2026, he signed with USL Championship club Oakland Roots SC. On MArch 7, 2026, he scored his first goal in the first match of the season, scoring the only goal in a 1-0 victory over Monterey Bay FC.

== Personal life ==
He is the younger brother of Grant Fisher, a professional middle- and long-distance runner.

== Career statistics ==
As of October 6, 2025

Club	Season	League			Playoffs		Domestic Cup		Continental		Total	
Club	Season	Division	Apps	Goals	Apps	Goals	Apps	Goals	Apps	Goals	Apps	Goals
Toronto FC II	2024	MLS Next Pro	25	2	—		–		–		25	2
Toronto FC II	2025	MLS Next Pro	14	1	—		–		–		14	1
Toronto FC II	Total		39	1	0	0	0	0	0	0	39	1
Toronto FC (loan)	2025	Major League Soccer	0	0	–		0	0	–		6	0
Career total			39	1	0	0	0	0	0	0	39	1
