= Shafique Wilson =

Canadian soccer player

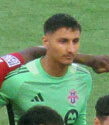
- Wilson in 2025

Personal information
- Full name: Shafique Christopher Wilson
- Date of birth: June 22, 2001 (age 25)
- Place of birth: Brampton, Ontario, Canada
- Height: 6 ft 5 in (1.96 m)
- Position: Goalkeeper

Team information
- Current team: Mikkelin Palloilijat

College career
Years	Team	Apps	(Gls)
2019	Florida Atlantic Owls	0	(0)
2021–2023	Albany Great Danes	31	(0)

Senior career*
Years	Team	Apps	(Gls)
2022	Woodbridge Strikers	11	(0)
2023	Fort Wayne FC	6	(0)
2024–2025	Toronto FC II	7	(0)
2026–	Mikkelin Palloilijat II	1	(0)
2026–	Mikkelin Palloilijat	4	(0)
- * Club domestic league appearances and goals as of November 4, 2026

Shafique Christopher Wilson (born June 22, 2001) is a Canadian soccer player who plays for Finnish Ykkösliiga club Mikkelin Palloilijat.

== College career ==
In 2019, Wilson began attending Florida Atlantic University, where he was a member of the men's soccer team, but did not make any appearances.

In 2021, he transferred to the University at Albany, SUNY, where he joined the men's soccer team. He made his debut on September 10, 2021, recording a clean sheet in a 1-0 victory over the Lafayette Leopards. In October 2022, he was named the America East Conference Co-Defensive Player of the Week. At the end of 2022, he received Academic All-District honours. At the end of 2023, he was named to the America East All-Academic team and again received Academic All-District honours.

== Club career ==
In 2022, Wilson played with the Woodbridge Strikers in League1 Ontario. In 2023, he played with Fort Wayne FC in USL League Two, making six appearances, helping them to win the Valley Division.

In March 2024, he signed a professional contract with Toronto FC II in MLS Next Pro. He made his debut on September 29, 2024, against Chattanooga FC. Toronto FC II exercised Wilson's contract option following the 2024 season.

In April 2026, Wilson signed with Finnish club Mikkelin Palloilijat in the second tier Ykkösliiga. He made his debut on June 14, in a 2-2 draw with HJK Helsinki.

== Personal life ==
He is the brother of fellow professional soccer player Armaan Wilson.

== Career statistics ==
As of October 6, 2025

Club	Season	League			Playoffs		National cup		Other		Total	
Club	Season	Division	Apps	Goals	Apps	Goals	Apps	Goals	Apps	Goals	Apps	Goals
Woodbridge Strikers	2022	League1 Ontario	11	0	—		—		—		11	0
Fort Wayne FC	2023	USL League Two	6	0	1	0	—		—		7	0
Toronto FC II	2024	MLS Next Pro	2	0	—		—		—		2	0
Toronto FC II	2025	MLS Next Pro	5	0	—		–		–		5	0
Toronto FC II	Total		5	0	0	0	0	0	0	0	5	0
Career total			24	0	1	0	0	0	0	0	25	0
