= Nicksoen Gomis =

French footballer (born 2002)

Personal information
- Date of birth: 15 March 2002 (age 24)
- Place of birth: Évreux, France
- Height: 6 ft 1 in (1.85 m)
- Position: Defender

Team information
- Current team: Toronto FC
- Number: 15

Youth career
- 2012–2018: Évreux FC 27
- 2018–2024: Sheffield United

Senior career*
Years	Team	Apps	(Gls)
2021–2024	Sheffield United	0	(0)
2022	→ Bradford (Park Avenue) (loan)	7	(0)
2023	→ Beerschot U23 (loan)	11	(2)
2023	→ Beerschot (loan)	1	(0)
2024–	Toronto FC	41	(0)

International career^{‡}
2019	France U18	2	(0)
- * Club domestic league appearances and goals as of 1 November 2026 ‡ National team caps and goals as of 22 August 2019

Nicksoen Gomis (born 15 March 2002) is a French professional footballer who plays for Toronto FC in Major League Soccer.

== Early life ==
Gomis began playing youth football with Évreux FC 27. In 2018, he joined English club Sheffield United's academy.

== Club career ==
After playing in the Sheffield Academy, the club sought out senior opportunities for him via loan. In October 2021, he was loaned to Bradford (Park Avenue) A.F.C. in the sixth tier National League North. On 16 March 2022, he made his first bench appearance for the Sheffield United first team in a league match against Blackpool, but did not appear in the match. In January 2023, he went on loan to Belgian club Beerschot in the second tier Challenger Pro League. He primarily played with Beerschot's U23 team in the fourth tier, but made his debut with the first team against RWD Molenbeek on 12 February 2023.

In February 2024, he moved to Toronto FC in Major League Soccer signing a two-year contract with options for 2026 and 2027. There was no upfront fee on the move, but Sheffield United will receive money if Gomis plays a certain number of matches and also retain a sell-on clause. He made his debut for Toronto on 3 March 2024, starting the match against the New England Revolution. In May 2025, he underwent surgery for an Achilles injury, causing him to miss the remainder of the 2025 season.

== International career ==
Born in France, Gomis is of Senegalese descent. He has represented the France U18, making two appearances, making his debut against Paraguay U18 in August 2019.

== Career statistics ==
As of match played 1 November 2026

Appearances and goals by club, season and competition
Club	Season	League			National cup		Continental		Other		Total	
Club	Season	Division	Apps	Goals	Apps	Goals	Apps	Goals	Apps	Goals	Apps	Goals
Sheffield United	2021–22	Championship	0	0	0	0	—		0	0	0	0
Bradford (Park Avenue) (loan)	2021–22	National League North	7	0	0	0	—		1 (Note: Appearance in EFL Trophy)	0	8	0
Beerschot U23 (loan)	2022–23	Belgian Division 2	11	2	—		—		—		11	2
Beerschot (loan)	2022–23	Challenger Pro League	1	0	0	0	—		—		1	0
Toronto FC	2024	Major League Soccer	24	0	4	0	—		2 (Note: Appearances in Leagues Cup)	0	30	0
Toronto FC	2025	Major League Soccer	6	0	1	0	—		—		7	0
Toronto FC	2026	Major League Soccer	11	0	0	0	—		—		11	0
Toronto FC	Total		41	0	5	0	—		2	0	48	0
Career total			60	2	5	0	0	0	3	0	68	2
