= Deiby Flores =

Honduran footballer (born 1996)

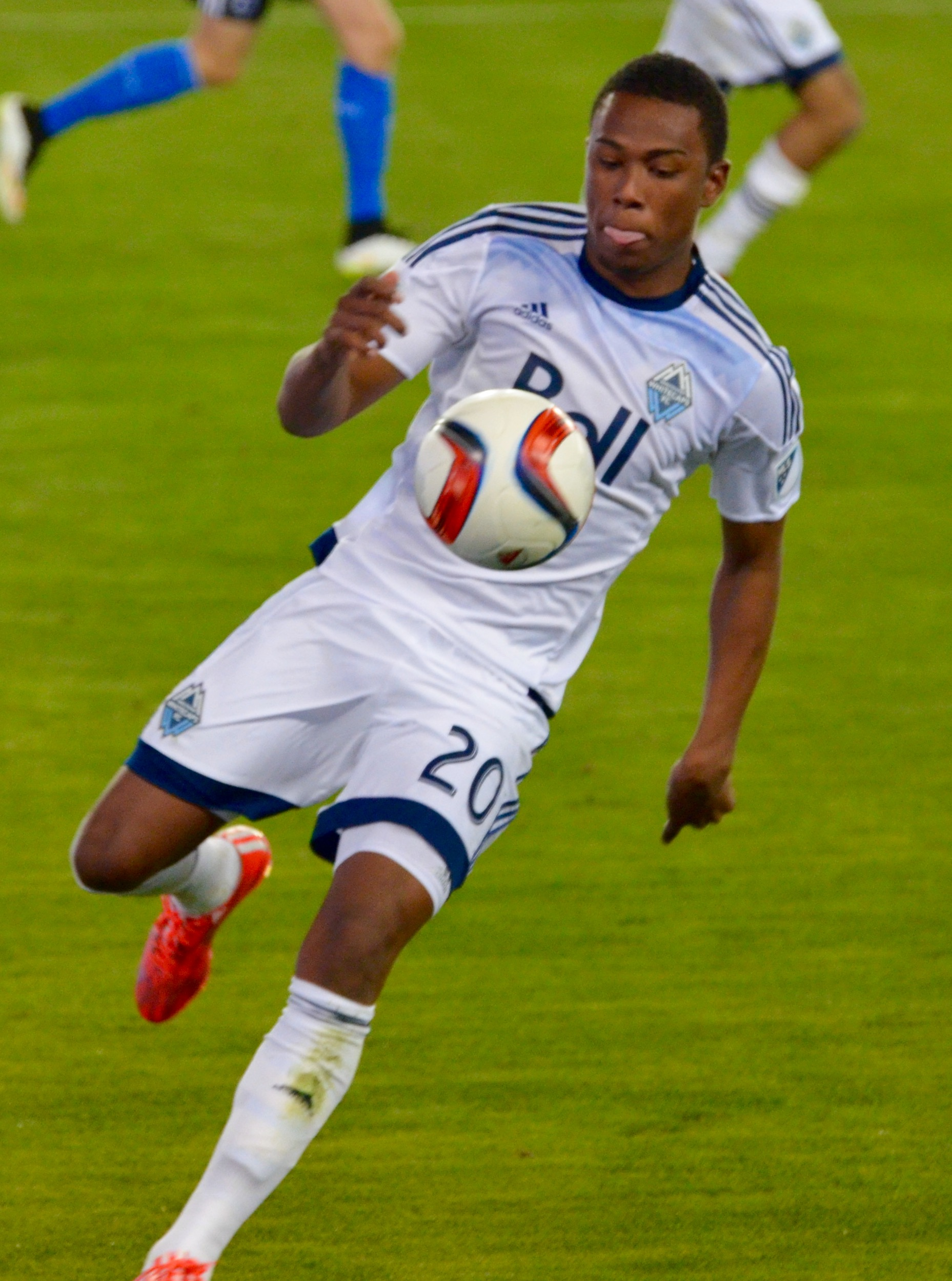
- Flores playing for Vancouver Whitecaps FC in 2015

Personal information
- Full name: Deiby Aldair Flores
- Date of birth: 16 June 1996 (age 30)
- Place of birth: San Pedro Sula, Honduras
- Height: 1.83 m (6 ft 0 in)
- Position: Defensive midfielder

Team information
- Current team: Petro de Luanda

Youth career
- Platense
- 2011–2014: Motagua

Senior career*
Years	Team	Apps	(Gls)
2014–2015	Motagua	22	(0)
2015–2018	→ Vancouver Whitecaps FC (loan)	10	(0)
2015–2017	→ Whitecaps FC 2 (loan)	13	(1)
2016	→ Motagua (loan)	4	(0)
2017–2018	→ Motagua (loan)	13	(0)
2018–2021	Olimpia	94	(2)
2021–2023	Panetolikos	48	(2)
2023	Fehérvár	31	(1)
2024–2025	Toronto FC	48	(3)
2025–2026	Al-Najma	17	(0)
2026–	Petro de Luanda	0	(0)

International career^{‡}
2013	Honduras U17	5	(0)
2014–2015	Honduras U20	13	(1)
2015–	Honduras	60	(1)
- * Club domestic league appearances and goals as of 16 June 2026 ‡ National team caps and goals as of 16 June 2026

Deiby Aldair Flores (born 16 June 1996) is a Honduran professional footballer who plays as a defensive midfielder for Girabola club Petro de Luanda and the Honduras national team.

== Club career ==
Born in San Pedro Sula, Flores made his debut for F.C. Motagua in the Liga Nacional de Fútbol Profesional de Honduras on 12 January 2014, coming on as a substitute for Irvin Reyna in a 1–0 away win against Deportes Savio.

On 24 February 2015, Flores joined Major League Soccer club Vancouver Whitecaps FC on a one-year loan with a transfer option. He made his debut on 28 March 2015, coming off the bench for Gershon Koffie against the Portland Timbers in a 2–1 home win. On 18 January 2016, Vancouver signed Flores from Motagua on a multi-year contract after making his loan move permanent.

On 9 August 2016, Flores returned to Motagua on a temporary loan deal until 31 December 2016. The following 12 July, he was loaned to Motagua again, this time until 30 June 2018.

On 2 July 2018, Flores was waived by Vancouver.

Flores returned to Major League Soccer in January 2024, signing with Toronto FC.

On 19 August 2025, Flores signed with Saudi Pro League side Al-Najma.

== International career ==
Flores was part of multiple youth teams of the Honduras national team. Among his participation stand-outs were his participation in the 2013 CONCACAF U-17 Championship and during qualification for the 2015 CONCACAF U-20 Championship, where he scored his side's goal in a 1–1 draw against Costa Rica, and got another in their 3–1 victory over Nicaragua. On 30 April 2015, Flores was called up for the 2015 FIFA U-20 World Cup in New Zealand. He made his debut for the senior national team in 2015 during a friendly against Cuba, which finished in a 2–0 victory.

== Career statistics ==
=== Club ===
As of match played 9 August 2025

Appearances and goals by club, season and competition
Club	Season	League			National cup		Continental		Other		Total	
Club	Season	Division	Apps	Goals	Apps	Goals	Apps	Goals	Apps	Goals	Apps	Goals
Motagua	2013–14	Honduran Liga Nacional	9	0	—		—		—		9	0
Motagua	2014–15	Honduran Liga Nacional	13	0	—		—		—		13	0
Motagua	Total		22	0	—		—		—		22	0
Vancouver Whitecaps FC (loan)	2015	MLS	9	0	2	0	4 (Note: Appearances in CONCACAF Champions League)	0	—		15	0
Whitecaps FC 2 (loan)	2015	USL Championship	3	0	—		—		—		3	0
Vancouver Whitecaps FC	2016	MLS	1	0	0	0	—		—		1	0
Vancouver Whitecaps FC	2017	MLS	0	0	—		—		—		0	0
Vancouver Whitecaps FC	2018	MLS	0	0	—		—		—		0	0
Vancouver Whitecaps FC	Total		1	0	—		—		—		1	0
Whitecaps FC 2 (loan)	2016	USL Championship	8	0	—		—		—		8	0
Motagua (loan)	2016–17	Honduran Liga Nacional	4	0	—		—		—		4	0
Whitecaps FC 2 (loan)	2017	USL Championship	2	0	—		—		—		2	0
Motagua (loan)	2017–18	Honduran Liga Nacional	13	0	—		—		—		13	0
Olimpia	2018–19	Honduran Liga Nacional	39	1	—		—		—		39	1
Olimpia	2019–20	Honduran Liga Nacional	18	1	—		8 (Note: Five appearances and one goal in CONCACAF League, three appearances in CONCACAF Champions League)	1	—		26	2
Olimpia	2020–21	Honduran Liga Nacional	37	0	—		6 (Note: Three appearances and one goal in CONCACAF League, three appearances in CONCACAF Champions League)	1	—		43	1
Olimpia	Total		94	2	—		14	2	—		108	4
Panetolikos	2021–22	Super League Greece	32	2	5	0	—		—		37	2
Panetolikos	2022–23	Super League Greece	16	0	1	2	—		—		17	2
Panetolikos	Total		48	2	6	2	—		—		54	4
Fehérvár	2022–23	NB I	15	0	—		—		—		15	0
Fehérvár	2023–24	NB I	16	1	—		—		—		16	1
Fehérvár	Total		31	1	—		—		—		31	1
Toronto FC	2024	MLS	29	1	6	0	—		3 (Note: Appearances in Leagues Cup)	0	38	1
Toronto FC	2025	MLS	19	2	1	0	—		—		20	2
Toronto FC	Total		48	3	7	0	—		3	0	58	3
Career total			283	8	15	2	18	2	3	0	319	12
