= Charlie Sharp =

American soccer player (born 2001)

Personal information
- Full name: Charles Sharp
- Date of birth: June 23, 2001 (age 25)
- Place of birth: Brighton, Michigan, United States
- Height: 6 ft 5 in (1.96 m)
- Position: Forward

Team information
- Current team: Indy Eleven
- Number: 9

Youth career
- Michigan Alliance FC
- Michigan Wolves SC

College career
Years	Team	Apps	(Gls)
2019–2023	Western Michigan Broncos	90	(43)

Senior career*
Years	Team	Apps	(Gls)
2021	Flint City Bucks	10	(3)
2022	Seacoast United Phantoms	9	(6)
2023	AFC Ann Arbor	5	(3)
2024	Toronto FC II	16	(5)
2024	→ Toronto FC (loan)	2	(0)
2024–2025	Toronto FC	6	(0)
2025	→ Toronto FC II (loan)	8	(1)
2025	→ Tampa Bay Rowdies (loan)	10	(0)
2026–	Indy Eleven	9	(0)
- * Club domestic league appearances and goals as of November 6, 2026

Charles Sharp (born June 23, 2001) is an American soccer player who plays as a forward for Indy Eleven in the USL Championship.

== Early life ==
Sharp played youth soccer with the Michigan Alliance FC, before later joining the Michigan Wolves SC.

Sharp attended Brighton High School where he earned all-conference, all-county, all-state honors in his senior year and was also named the Livingston County Player of the Year in 2018.

== College career ==
In 2019, Sharp began attending Western Michigan University, where he played for the men's soccer team. On September 14, 2019, he score his first collegiate goal in a victory over the Cincinnati Bearcats. In October 2019, he was named the Mid-American Conference Player of the Week and was named to the National Team of the Week. At the end of his first season, he was named the MAC Freshman of the Year and named to the All-MAC First Team and College Soccer News All-Freshman Team. In his sophomore season, he was named to the All-MAC Academic Team. At the end of his junior season, he was named to the All-MAC Second Team, All-North Region Third Team, and the All-MAC Academic Team.

He began his senior season with a hat trick in an exhibition match against the Cleveland State Vikings. He was named the MAC Player of the Week three times and was named as the MAC Scholar Athlete of the Week once. He helped the school win the MAC title that season, where he was named the MAC Tournament MVP. That season he was aksi named to the All-MAC First Team, All-North Region First Team, First Team Scholar All-American, First Team Academic All-America, and Academic All-District.

He returned for a fifth season in 2023 and was name to the Forwards to Watch List, TopDrawerSoccer Preseason All-American Third Team, and the Mac Hermann Trophy Watch List prior to the season. On September 10, he scored a hat trick in a victory over the Dayton Flyers. During the season, he was named the Missouri Valley Conference Offensive Player of the Week twice, named to the College Soccer News National Team of the Week, and the National Player of the Week. On November 8, 2023, he became the school's all-time leading scorer. On November 16, he scored a hat trick in a 3–0 victory over the Green Bay Phoenix. At the end of the season he was named the National Scholar Player Of The Year and was a finalist for the Mac Hermann Trophy (awarded to the top college soccer player of the year). He was also named to the All-MVC First Team, was a First Team All-American, TopDrawerSoccer First Team All-American, Academic All-District Team, Academic All-America Second Team, He led the NCAA in goals (19) and points (46) in 2023.

== Club career ==
In 2021, Sharp played with the Flint City Bucks in USL League Two. In 2022, he played with the Seacoast United Phantoms. In 2023, he played with AFC Ann Arbor, where he was the team's second top goal scorer.

At the 2023 MLS SuperDraft, Sharp was selected in the third round (61st overall) by Toronto FC. However, he did not immediately join the club, instead returning to college for an additional year. After attending pre-season with the first team, in February 2024, he signed a professional contract with Toronto FC II in MLS Next Pro. He made his debut on April 7 against Columbus Crew 2. He scored his first goal for the club on April 14, in a victory over FC Cincinnati 2. In May 2024, he joined the Toronto FC first team on a short-term loan ahead of the league match against Nashville SC, making his debut in that match on May 15, in a substitute appearance. He signed another two short-term loans that season.

In September 2024, he signed a MLS contract with the Toronto FC first team through the 2025 season, with options for 2026 and 2027. In 2025, he was loaned to the second team for some matches.

In August 2025, Sharp was loaned to USL Championship club Tampa Bay Rowdies for the remainder of the 2025 season.

In December 2025, Sharp joined Indy Eleven on a permanent deal ahead of the 2026 season.

== Career statistics ==
As of match played July 12, 2025

Appearances and goals by club, season and competition
Club	Season	League			Playoffs		National cup		Other		Total	
Club	Season	Division	Apps	Goals	Apps	Goals	Apps	Goals	Apps	Goals	Apps	Goals
Toronto FC II	2024	MLS Next Pro	16	5	—		—		—		16	5
Toronto FC (loan)	2024	Major League Soccer	2	0	—		0	0	0	0	2	0
Toronto FC	2025	Major League Soccer	6	0	0	0	0	0	—		6	0
Toronto FC	Total		8	0	0	0	0	0	0	0	8	0
Toronto FC II (loan)	2025	MLS Next Pro	8	1	–		—		—		8	1
Career total			32	6	0	0	0	0	0	0	32	6
