= Nathaniel Edwards (soccer) =

Canadian soccer player (born 2002)

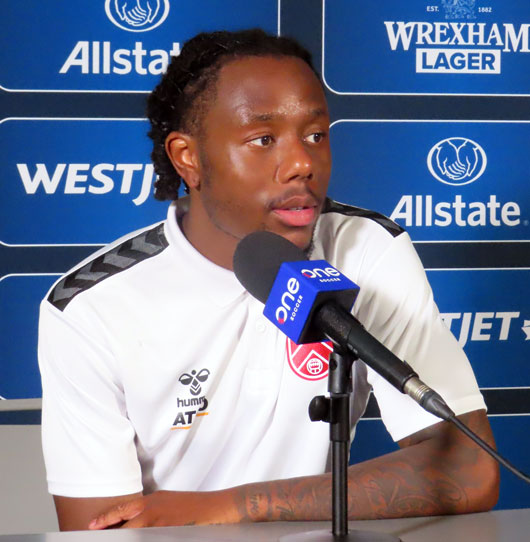
- Edwards in 2026

Personal information
- Date of birth: October 18, 2002 (age 24)
- Place of birth: Brampton, Ontario, Canada
- Height: 1.73 m (5 ft 8 in)
- Position: Forward

Team information
- Current team: Cavalry FC

Youth career
- Brampton East SC
- Vaughan Azzurri
- Bolton Wanderers SC

College career
Years	Team	Apps	(Gls)
2020–2022	Purdue Fort Wayne Mastodons	40	(2)
2023	Syracuse Orange	21	(1)

Senior career*
Years	Team	Apps	(Gls)
2023	Vaughan Azzurri	5	(1)
2024	Toronto FC II	24	(2)
2024	→ Toronto FC (loan)	0	(0)
2024–2025	Toronto FC	0	(0)
2025	→ Toronto FC II (loan)	25	(3)
2026–	Cavalry FC	25	(6)
- * Club domestic league appearances and goals as of October 25, 2026

Nathaniel Edwards (born October 18, 2002) is a Canadian soccer player who plays as a forward for Canadian Premier League club Cavalry FC.

== Early life ==
Edwards grew up in Brampton, Ontario. He played youth soccer with Brampton East SC, Bolton Wanderers SC, and Vaughan Azzurri.

== College career ==
In 2020, Edwards began attending Purdue University Fort Wayne, where he played for the men's soccer team. He was named to the Horizon League Academic Honor Roll in the Fall of 2021 and Spring of 2022.

For his senior season, Edwards transferred to Syracuse University to play for the men's soccer team. On September 29, 2023, he scored his first goal for Syracuse in a loss to the Duke Blue Devils. On October 18, he recorded his first multi-assist game, recording assists on both goals in a 2-0 victory over the Yale Bulldogs. At the end of the season, he earned Academic All-District Honors and was named to the ACC All-Academic Team.

== Club career ==
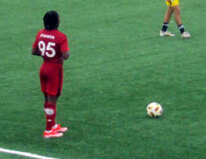
Edwards takes a free kick

In 2023, Edwards played with Vaughan Azzurri in League1 Ontario.

=== Toronto FC ===
In February 2024, he signed a professional contract with Toronto FC II in MLS Next Pro. He made his debut on March 17 in a match against Philadelphia Union II. In May 2024, he joined the Toronto FC first team on a short-term loan ahead of a 2024 Canadian Championship match, making his debut in the match on May 21 against CS Saint-Laurent. He scored his first goal for Toronto FC II on June 26 in a 2-1 victory over Inter Miami II. He signed an additional two short-term loans in July.

In September 2024, he signed a MLS contract with the Toronto FC first team through the 2025 season, with options for 2026 and 2027. In 2025, he was loaned to the second team for some matches.

=== Cavalry FC ===
In February 2026, Edwards would sign a two year contract with Canadian Premier League club Cavalry FC, with a club option for the 2028 season.

== Career statistics ==
As of match played November 21, 2026

Appearances and goals by club, season and competition
Club	Season	League			Playoffs		National cup		Other		Total	
Club	Season	Division	Apps	Goals	Apps	Goals	Apps	Goals	Apps	Goals	Apps	Goals
Vaughan Azzurri	2023	League1 Ontario	5	1	0	0	0	0	–		5	1
Toronto FC II	2024	MLS Next Pro	24	2	–		–		–		24	2
Toronto FC (loan)	2024	Major League Soccer	0	0	—		1	0	0	0	1	0
Toronto FC	2025	Major League Soccer	0	0	–		0	0	–		0	0
Toronto FC	Toronto total		0	0	0	0	1	0	0	0	1	0
Toronto FC II (loan)	2025	MLS Next Pro	25	3	—		—		—		25	3
Cavalry FC	2026	CPL	25	6	3	0	1	0	0	0	29	6
Career total			79	12	3	0	2	0	0	0	84	12
