= Raoul Petretta =

Italian footballer

Personal information
- Date of birth: 24 March 1997 (age 29)
- Place of birth: Rheinfelden, Germany
- Height: 1.76 m (5 ft 9 in)
- Position: Left-back

Team information
- Current team: Darmstadt 98
- Number: 18

Youth career
- 2000–2003: SC Rheinfelden 03
- 2003–2015: Basel

Senior career*
Years	Team	Apps	(Gls)
2015–2022	Basel II	47	(1)
2017–2022	Basel	109	(7)
2022–2023	Kasımpaşa	9	(1)
2023–2025	Toronto FC	76	(1)
2026–	Darmstadt 98	10	(0)

International career^{‡}
2018	Italy U21	1	(0)
- * Club domestic league appearances and goals as of 18 May 2026 ‡ National team caps and goals as of 25 May 2018

Raoul Petretta (born 24 March 1997) is a professional footballer who plays as a left-back for 2. Bundesliga club Darmstadt 98. Born in Germany, he has represented Italy at youth level.

== Early life ==
Petretta began playing football with SC Rheinfelden 03. After three years, he joined Swiss club FC Basel at age six. He spent the remainder of his youth career with Basel, progressing from the U7 level to the U21 level, before joining the first team.

== Club career ==
Petretta began his senior career with Basel II in the third tier Swiss Promotion League. He scored his first goal on 29 October 2016 against FC United Zürich.

In February 2017, he signed a professional contract with FC Basel. He made his professional debut for FC Basel on 4 February 2017 against FC Lugano in a Swiss Super League match. He made his UEFA Champions League debut on 27 September 2017 against Portuguese club Benfica. On 14 October 2017, he scored his first goal against FC Lugano. In December 2020, he suffered a spinal cord injury during a match, but was able to avoid serious injury. On 15 May 2021 he scored a brace against FC Zurich. During his time with Basel, Petretta played in the UEFA Champions League, UEFA Europa League and UEFA Conference League and won the Swiss Super League in 2016–17 and the Swiss Cup twice in 2016–17 and 2018–19. In May 2022, it was announced that he would depart Basel upon the expiry of his contract, after rejecting a contract extension.

In July 2022, Petretta signed with Turkish Süper Lig club Kasımpaşa. He made his debut on 8 August 2022 against İstanbul Başakşehir. He departed the club in January 2023.

In January 2023, Petretta joined Major League Soccer side Toronto FC on a contract through 2025, with an option for 2026. He scored his first goal for the club on 11 May 2024 against New York City FC. On 15 May, he served as team captain for the first time in a match against Nashville SC, with other players unavailable for the match.

On 20 January 2026, Petretta signed with Darmstadt 98 in the 2. Bundesliga.

== International career ==
Petretta was born in Germany to an Italian father and German mother, but does not hold German citizenship. On 25 May 2018, he made his debut with the Italy U21 team in a friendly against Portugal.

== Career statistics ==
As of match played 18 October 2025

Appearances and goals by club, season and competition
Club	Season	League			Cup		Continental		Other		Total	
Club	Season	Division	Apps	Goals	Apps	Goals	Apps	Goals	Apps	Goals	Apps	Goals
Basel II	2015–16	Swiss Promotion League	14	0	—		—		—		14	0
Basel II	2016–17	Swiss Promotion League	24	1	—		—		—		25	1
Basel II	2017–18	Swiss Promotion League	6	0	—		—		—		6	0
Basel II	2018–19	Swiss Promotion League	2	0	—		—		—		2	0
Basel II	2021–22	Swiss Promotion League	1	0	—		—		—		1	0
Basel II	Total		47	1	—		—		—		47	1
Basel	2016–17	Swiss Super League	5	0	0	0	0	0	—		5	0
Basel	2017–18	Swiss Super League	17	1	3	0	5	0	—		25	1
Basel	2018–19	Swiss Super League	21	1	3	0	5	0	—		29	1
Basel	2019–20	Swiss Super League	27	1	5	0	12	1	—		44	2
Basel	2020–21	Swiss Super League	26	3	1	0	0	0	—		27	3
Basel	2021–22	Swiss Super League	13	1	1	1	8	1	—		22	3
Basel	Total		109	7	13	1	30	2	—		152	10
Kasımpaşa	2022–23	Süper Lig	9	1	3	0	—		—		12	1
Toronto FC	2023	Major League Soccer	24	0	0	0	—		2 (Note: Appearances in Leagues Cup)	0	26	0
Toronto FC	2024	Major League Soccer	27	1	3	0	—		3	0	33	1
Toronto FC	2025	Major League Soccer	25	0	1	0	—		—		26	0
Toronto FC	Total		76	1	4	0	—		5	0	85	1
Career total			241	10	20	1	30	2	5	0	296	13

== Honours ==
Basel

- Swiss Super League: 2016–17
- Swiss Cup: 2016–17, 2018–19
