= Andrei Dumitru =

Canadian soccer player

- Dumitru in 2025

Personal information
- Full name: Andrei Dan Dumitru
- Date of birth: October 28, 2006 (age 20)
- Place of birth: Milton, Ontario, Canada
- Height: 1.85 m (6 ft 1 in)
- Position: Midfielder

Team information
- Current team: Metaloglobus București
- Number: 16

Youth career
- –2016: ProStars FC
- 2016–2024: Toronto FC

Senior career*
Years	Team	Apps	(Gls)
2024–2025	Toronto FC II	28	(0)
2024	→ Toronto FC (loan)	0	(0)
2025–2026	Botoșani	1	(0)
2026–	Metaloglobus București	9	(3)

International career^{‡}
2023	Canada U17	5	(0)
2024	Canada U20	3	(0)
- * Club domestic league appearances and goals as of 31 October 2026 ‡ National team caps and goals as of 30 July 2024

Andrei Dan Dumitru (born October 28, 2006) is a professional footballer who plays as a midfielder for Liga II club Metaloglobus București. Born in Canada, he represented their youth teams, before filing his one-time switch in 2025 to represent Romania.

== Early life ==
Dumitru began playing soccer at age four with ProStars FC and also began playing futsal at the same age with Futsal Club Toronto. In October 2016, he joined the Toronto FC Academy.

== Club career ==
In March 2024, Dumitru signed a professional contract with Toronto FC II in MLS Next Pro. He made his professional debut on April 7 against Columbus Crew 2.

In April 2024, he joined the Toronto FC first team on a short-term loan. He subsequently signed an additional three short-term loans over the next couple of months. He made his first team debut on April 24, in a 2024 Canadian Championship match against Simcoe County Rovers FC.

In August 2025, he transferred to Romanian Liga I side FC Botoșani.

In July 2026, he signed with Liga II club Metaloglobus București.

== International career ==
Born in Canada, Dumitru is of Romanian descent. In December 2022, he was called up to the Canada U17 for the first time. In January 2023, Dumitru was named to the squad for the 2023 CONCACAF U-17 Championship.

In June 2024, Dumitru received his first call up to the Canadian U20 side for a camp in Chile. The next month on July 11 he was named to the final squad ahead of the 2024 CONCACAF U-20 Championship.

On October 20, 2025, Dumitru's request to switch international allegiance to Romania was approved by FIFA.

== Career statistics ==
As of match played 31 October 2026

Appearances and goals by club, season and competition
Club	Season	League			National cup (Note: Includes Canadian Championship, Cupa României)		Continental		Other		Total	
Club	Season	Division	Apps	Goals	Apps	Goals	Apps	Goals	Apps	Goals	Apps	Goals
Toronto FC II	2024	MLS Next Pro	21	0	—		—		—		21	0
Toronto FC II	2025	MLS Next Pro	7	0	—		—		—		7	0
Toronto FC II	Total		28	0	—		—		—		28	0
Toronto FC (loan)	2024	Major League Soccer	0	0	2	0	—		—		2	0
Botoșani	2025–26	Liga I	1	0	4	0	—		—		6	0
Metaloglobus București	2026–27	Liga II	9	3	1	0	—		—		10	3
Career total			38	3	7	0	0	0	0	0	45	3
