= Charlie Staniland =

English footballer

Personal information
- Date of birth: November 12, 2004 (age 22)
- Place of birth: Sheffield, England
- Height: 5 ft 8 in (1.73 m)
- Position: Midfielder

Team information
- Current team: Guiseley

Youth career
- 2012–2024: Sheffield United

Senior career*
Years	Team	Apps	(Gls)
2024	Toronto FC II	25	(2)
2024	→ Toronto FC (loan)	0	(0)
2025	Sheffield FC		
2025–2026	Hallam		
2026–	Guiseley		
- * Club domestic league appearances and goals as of 12 August 2025

Charlie Staniland (born 12 November 2004) is an English footballer who plays as a midfielder for Northern Premier League Premier side Guiseley.

== Early life ==
In 2012, Staniland joined Sheffield United's academy. In July 2021, he signed a scholarship contract with Sheffield United. After completing his scholarship, he signed a pro deal with the club in July 2023.

== Club career ==
In April 2024, Staniland signed a professional contract with Toronto FC II in MLS Next Pro. He made his debut on 19 April against New England Revolution II. In May 2024, he joined the Toronto FC first team on a short-term loan on four occasions, ahead of league matches. On 23 May 2024, he scored his first goal for Toronto FC II in a match against Carolina Core FC. Staniland's contract expired in November 2024.

In January 2025, he returned to England and joined Northern Premier League Division One East side Sheffield FC. In July 2025, he signed with Hallam in the same division. He made his debut for Hallam on 3 August 2025, in a 3-1 victory over Lower Breck in the 2025–26 FA Cup qualifying rounds.

In June 2026, he signed with Northern Premier League Premier side Guiseley.

== Career statistics ==
As of match played 12 August 2025

Appearances and goals by club, season and competition
Club	Season	League			National cup		Other		Total	
Club	Season	Division	Apps	Goals	Apps	Goals	Apps	Goals	Apps	Goals
Toronto FC II	2024	MLS Next Pro	25	2	—		–		25	2
Toronto FC (loan)	2024	Major League Soccer	0	0	0	0	0	0	0	0
Career total			25	2	0	0	0	0	25	2
