= Hassan Ayari =

English footballer

Personal information
- Full name: Hassan Ben Kamel Ayari
- Date of birth: December 8, 2002 (age 23)
- Place of birth: New York City, New York, United States
- Height: 5 ft 11 in (1.80 m)
- Position: Midfielder

Team information
- Current team: Cavalry FC
- Number: 11

Youth career
- 2014–2019: TW Braga
- 2019–2023: Sheffield United

Senior career*
| Years | Team | Apps | (Gls) |
| 2022–2023 | Sheffield United | 0 | (0) |
| 2022 | → Scarborough Athletic (loan) | 4 | (0) |
| 2024–2025 | Toronto FC II | 50 | (12) |
| 2024 | → Toronto FC (loan) | 0 | (0) |
| 2026 | Vihren | 12 | (2) |
| 2026– | Cavalry FC | 3 | (0) |

International career^{‡}
| 2021 | Tunisia U20 | 8 | (1) |
- * Club domestic league appearances and goals as of October 3, 2026 ‡ National team caps and goals as of 10 October 2021

Hassan Ben Kamel Ayari (Arabic: حسن العياري; born 8 December 2002) is a professional footballer who plays as a winger for Canadian Premier League club Cavalry FC. Born in the United States, he represented Tunisia at youth international level.

== Early life ==
In August 2014, he joined Northern Ireland club TW Braga's youth academy. However, the club was later fined £8,500 by FIFA for improper registration of Ayari, despite him having a European passport.

In 2019, Ayari joined the Sheffield United F.C. Academy. In January 2021, he debuted with Sheffield United's U23 team, scoring a brace in his first appearance.

== Club career ==
In July 2021, after completing his scholarship, Ayari signed a professional deal for Sheffield United. In September 2022, Ayari was loaned to Scarborough Athletic in the sixth tier National League North. In late October 2022, he was recalled by Sheffield United, terminating the loan early. In November 2022, after asking to leave the club, he went on trial with Sheffield Wednesday. However, he did not signed with Sheffield Wednesday and ultimately returned to Sheffield United's youth sides. His contract would expire in the summer of 2023. After his contract expired, he went on trial with Burton Albion.

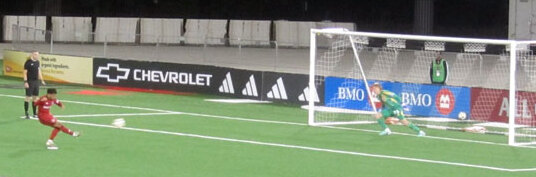
Ayari scores on his penalty kick

In April 2024, Ayari signed a professional contract with Toronto FC II in MLS Next Pro. He made his debut on 19 April, in a substitute appearance, against New England Revolution II. In June 2024, he signed a short-term loan with the Toronto FC first team.

In February 2026, Ayari signed with Vihren in the Bulgarian Second League.

In September 2026, Ayari signed a contract with Canadian Premier League club Cavalry FC through the end of the 2027 season, with a club option for 2028.

== International career ==
Ayari was born in the United States to a Lithuanian mother and a Tunisian father.

In 2020, he committed to play for Tunisia. In 2021, he played with Tunisia U20 at the 2021 U-20 Africa Cup of Nations.

== Career statistics ==
As of match played October 3, 2026

Appearances and goals by club, season and competition
| Club | Season | League | | | Playoffs | | National cup | | Other | | Total | |
| Club | Season | Division | Apps | Goals | Apps | Goals | Apps | Goals | Apps | Goals | Apps | Goals |
|---|---|---|---|---|---|---|---|---|---|---|---|---|
| Sheffield United | 2022–23 | EFL Championship | 0 | 0 | – | | 0 | 0 | 0 | 0 | 0 | 0 |
| Scarborough Athletic (loan) | 2022–23 | National League North | 4 | 0 | – | | 0 | 0 | 0 | 0 | 4 | 0 |
| Toronto FC II | 2024 | MLS Next Pro | 23 | 6 | — | | – | | – | | 23 | 6 |
| Toronto FC II | 2025 | MLS Next Pro | 27 | 6 | — | | – | | – | | 27 | 6 |
| Toronto FC II | Total | | 50 | 12 | 0 | 0 | 0 | 0 | 0 | 0 | 50 | 12 |
| Toronto FC (loan) | 2025 | Major League Soccer | 0 | 0 | – | | 0 | 0 | – | | 0 | 0 |
| Vihren | 2025–26 | Second League | 12 | 2 | 0 | 0 | 0 | 0 | 0 | 0 | 12 | 2 |
| Cavalry FC | 2026 | Canadian Premier League | 3 | 0 | 0 | 0 | 0 | 0 | 0 | 0 | 3 | 0 |
| Career total | | | 69 | 14 | 0 | 0 | 0 | 0 | 0 | 0 | 69 | 14 |
