= Markus Cimermancic =

Slovenian footballer (born 2004)

- Cimermancic with Toronto FC II in 2024

Personal information
- Full name: Markus Joseph Cimermancic
- Date of birth: October 1, 2004 (age 22)
- Place of birth: Kitchener, Ontario, Canada
- Position: Midfielder

Team information
- Current team: Toronto FC
- Number: 71

Youth career
- Kitchener SC
- 2015–2022: Toronto FC

Senior career*
| Years | Team | Apps | (Gls) |
| 2021 | Toronto FC III | 6 | (0) |
| 2022–2024 | Toronto FC II | 57 | (6) |
| 2023–2024 | → Toronto FC (loan) | 0 | (0) |
| 2025– | Toronto FC | 20 | (1) |
| 2025– | → Toronto FC II (loan) | 9 | (4) |

International career^{‡}
| 2026– | Slovenia U21 | 1 | (0) |
- * Club domestic league appearances and goals as of November 7, 2026 ‡ National team caps and goals as of October 2, 2026

Markus Joseph Cimermancic (Slovene: Cimermančič; born October 1, 2004) is a footballer who plays for Toronto FC in Major League Soccer. Born in Canada, he is a youth international for Slovenia.

== Early life ==
Cimermancic began playing youth soccer for seven years with Kitchener SC, before joining the Toronto FC Academy in February 2015. In 2019, he was part of the TFC U15 team that were the U.S. Soccer Development Academy conference champions after posting an undefeated regular season and reached the 2019 Generation Adidas Cup finals and becoming the first Canadian team to win the USSDA National Championship.

== Club career ==
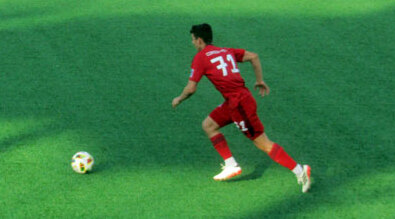
Markus Cimermancic with Toronto FC II in 2024

In 2021, he played with Toronto FC III in the League1 Ontario Summer Championship division.

In 2022, he played with Toronto FC II in MLS Next Pro as an academy callup, making his debut on May 8, 2022 against New York City FC II. In March 2023, he signed a full professional contract with the team. On March 24, 2023, he joined the first team on a short-term four day loan ahead of the team's match against the San Jose Earthquakes. He signed two additional short-term loans that season. The following season, he signed another four short-term loans in June and July. In November 2024, Toronto FC II exercised Cimermancic's contract option for the 2025 season. After of the 2025 season, he was invited to training camp with the first team.

In February 2025, he signed a two-year homegrown player contract with Toronto FC with options for 2027 and 2028. He was loaned to the second team for some matches as well.

== International career ==
Born in Canada, Cimermancic is of Slovenian descent and holds dual citizenship.

In September 2026, Cimermancic was called up to the Slovenia U21 team for their 2027 UEFA European Under-21 Championship qualification matches.

== Career statistics ==
As of match played November 7, 2026

Appearances and goals by club, season and competition
| Club | Season | League | | | Playoffs | | National cup | | Continental | | Total | |
| Club | Season | Division | Apps | Goals | Apps | Goals | Apps | Goals | Apps | Goals | Apps | Goals |
|---|---|---|---|---|---|---|---|---|---|---|---|---|
| Toronto FC III | 2021 | League1 Ontario Summer Championship | 6 | 0 | — | | — | | — | | 6 | 0 |
| Toronto FC II | 2022 | MLS Next Pro | 13 | 0 | 2 | 0 | — | | — | | 15 | 0 |
| Toronto FC II | 2023 | MLS Next Pro | 21 | 2 | — | | — | | — | | 21 | 2 |
| Toronto FC II | 2024 | MLS Next Pro | 23 | 4 | — | | — | | — | | 23 | 4 |
| Toronto FC II | Total | | 57 | 6 | 2 | 0 | 0 | 0 | 0 | 0 | 59 | 6 |
| Toronto FC | 2025 | Major League Soccer | 9 | 0 | — | | 0 | 0 | — | | 9 | 0 |
| Toronto FC | 2026 | Major League Soccer | 11 | 1 | — | | 1 | 0 | — | | 12 | 1 |
| Toronto FC | Total | | 20 | 1 | 0 | 0 | 1 | 0 | 0 | 0 | 21 | 1 |
| Toronto FC II (loan) | 2025 | MLS Next Pro | 7 | 4 | — | | — | | — | | 7 | 4 |
| Toronto FC II (loan) | 2026 | MLS Next Pro | 2 | 0 | — | | — | | — | | 2 | 0 |
| Toronto FC II (loan) | Total | | 9 | 4 | 0 | 0 | 0 | 0 | 0 | 0 | 9 | 4 |
| Career total | | | 91 | 11 | 2 | 0 | 1 | 0 | 0 | 0 | 94 | 11 |
