= 2021 Indy Eleven season =

Indy Eleven
2021 season
- Owner: List: Brian Bauer Don Gottwald Shane Hageman Jeffrey Laborsky Fred Merritt Ersal Ozdemir Quinn Ricker Chris Traylor
- Head coach: Max Rogers (interim)
- USL Championship: Eastern Conference: 12th
- USLC Playoffs: TBD
- U.S. Open Cup: TBD
- Highest home attendance: 7,999 (10/2 v. ATL)
- Lowest home attendance: 1,999 (5/8 v. TUL)
- Average home league attendance: 5,599
- Biggest win: IND 2–0 SKC (5/22); TUL 0–2 IND (8/4); IND 2–0 SLC (8/28)
- Biggest defeat: ATL 6–2 IND (8/8)
Home colors	Away colors

The 2021 Indy Eleven season was the club's eighth season of existence, their eighth consecutive season in the second tier of American soccer, and their fourth season in the league now named the USL Championship. This article covers the period from November 2, 2020 (the day after the ultimately cancelled 2020 USLC playoffs final) to the end of the 2021 USLC season (tentatively scheduled for November 2021).

== Roster ==
As of June 24, 2021

No.	Pos.	Nation	Player
1	GK	USA	Jordan Farr
2	DF	USA	Patrick Seagrist (on loan from Inter Miami CF)
3	DF	USA	A. J. Cochran
4	DF	BIH	Nedeljko Malić
5	DF	USA	Jared Timmer
6	MF	USA	Jeremiah Gutjahr
7	DF	ESP	Ayoze
8	FW	SCO	Cammy Smith
9	DF	CAN	Carl Haworth
10	FW	GER	Gordon Wild
12	MF	USA	Patrick McDonald
13	GK	USA	Eric Dick (on loan from Columbus Crew)
15	DF	TRI	Neveal Hackshaw
16	DF	USA	Aidan Liu (on loan from Vejle BK)
17	FW	USA	Nick Moon
19	DF	USA	Rece Buckmaster
20	DF	CAN	Karl Ouimette
21	FW	USA	Matthew Roou
22	FW	CAN	Jordan Hamilton
24	GK	USA	Alex Svetanoff
25	DF	USA	Matthew Senanou
26	GK	USA	Bobby Edwards
27	MF	ENG	Nicky Law
28	MF	GHA	Gershon Koffie
29	FW	VEN	Manuel Arteaga
85	MF	MLI	Aboubacar Sissoko
98	MF	JAM	Peter-Lee Vassell

1. USL Academy Contract

== Competitions ==
=== USL Championship ===
==== Standings ====
Pos	Team	Pld	W	L	T	GF	GA	GD	Pts	Qualification
1	Louisville City FC	32	18	7	7	61	37	+24	61	Advance to USL Championship Playoffs
2	Birmingham Legion FC	32	18	8	6	51	31	+20	60	Advance to USL Championship Playoffs
3	Memphis 901 FC	32	14	10	8	47	42	+5	50	Advance to USL Championship Playoffs
4	FC Tulsa	32	14	13	5	49	48	+1	47	Advance to USL Championship Playoffs
5	OKC Energy FC	32	8	11	13	30	38	−8	37	
6	Indy Eleven	32	9	15	8	32	47	−15	35	
7	Atlanta United 2	32	8	14	10	47	56	−9	34 (Note: The USL awarded a 3–0 win to Atlanta United 2 after Sporting Kansas City II fielded Jake Davis who was an ineligible player. The original score was 1–0 for Sporting Kansas City II.)	
8	Sporting Kansas City II	32	4	20	8	33	64	−31	20	

Source: USL

==== Match results ====
May 1 1	Birmingham Legion FC	0–1	Indy Eleven	Birmingham, AL
7:30 PM EDT	Asiedu (yellow card) 61'; Williams (red card) 87'	Report	Arteaga 28'; Hamilton (yellow card) 90+5'	Stadium: BBVA Field; Attendance: 0 Referee: Greg Dopka

May 8 2	Indy Eleven	0–2	FC Tulsa	Indianapolis, IN
7:00 PM EDT		Report	Rivas 62', 81' (pen.)	Stadium: Carroll Stadium; Attendance: 1,999; Referee: Lukasz Szpala

May 22 3	Indy Eleven	2–0	Sporting Kansas City II	Indianapolis, IN
7:00 PM EDT	Hamilton 53'; Arteaga 65'	Report	Rešetar (yellow card) 48'	Stadium: Carroll Stadium; Attendance: 3,999; Referee: Matthew Corrigan

May 29 4	Louisville City FC	1–2	Indy Eleven	Louisville, KY
7:30 PM EDT	Lancaster (yellow card) 11'; Bone 45'; DelPiccolo (yellow card) 71'; Hubbard (yellow card) 88'	Report	Hamilton 63' (pen.), 89' (pen.); Seagrist (yellow card) 77'	Stadium: Lynn Family Stadium; Attendance: 10,731; Referee: Elijio Arreguin

June 2 5	Indy Eleven	1–1	OKC Energy FC	Indianapolis, IN
7:00 PM EDT	Moon 42'	Report	Daniels (yellow card) 65'; López 69'	Stadium: Michael A. Carroll Stadium; Attendance: 3,999; Referee: Calin Radosav

June 5 6	Indy Eleven	1–2	Memphis 901 FC	Indianapolis, IN
7:00 PM EDT	Smith (yellow card) 30'; Cochran (yellow card) 43'; Ouimette 90+6'	Report	Salazar 3'; Murphy 35'; Atuahene (yellow card) 44'	Stadium: Michael A. Carroll Stadium; Attendance: 4,999; Referee: Matthew Thompson

June 9 7	El Paso Locomotive FC	2–0	Indy Eleven	El Paso, TX
9:00 PM EDT	Ross 2'; Luna 49'; Rebellón (yellow card) 57'	Report	Koffie (yellow card) 6'; Smith (yellow card) 40'; Ouimette (yellow card) 44'	Stadium: Southwest University Park; Attendance: 5,189; Referee: Jon Freemon

June 15 8	Indy Eleven	0–1	Pittsburgh Riverhounds SC	Indianapolis, IN
7:00 PM EDT	Ayoze (yellow card) 65'; Seagrist (yellow card) 89'	Report	Griffin (yellow card) 25'; Williamson 37', (yellow card) 59'; Peters (yellow card) 58' (yellow-red card) 62'; Dixon (yellow card) 90'; Dikwa (yellow card) 90+3'	Stadium: Lucas Oil Stadium; Attendance: 4,999; Referee: Chris Ruska

June 20 9	Sporting Kansas City II	1–2	Indy Eleven	Kansas City, KS
5:00 PM EDT	Mushagalusa 20'; Duke (yellow card) 90+2'	Report	Law (yellow card) 12', (goal) 19'; Wild 50'; Cochran (yellow card) 83'; Gutjahr (yellow card) 90+5'	Stadium: Children's Mercy Park; Referee: Adam Kilpatrick

June 26 10	Louisville City FC	3–3	Indy Eleven	Louisville, KY
7:30 PM EDT	DelPiccolo 6'; Gómez 14'; Bone (yellow card) 32', (goal) 78'; Hoppenot (yellow card) 70'	Report	Smith 9', (yellow card) 33'; Hackshaw 20'; Arteaga 41'; Vassell (yellow card) 74'	Stadium: Lynn Family Stadium; Attendance: 10,927

July 3 11	Indy Eleven	0–1	Birmingham Legion FC	Indianapolis, IN
7:00 PM EDT	Ouimette (yellow card) 7'; Ayoze (yellow card) 76'	Report	Brett 8' (pen.); Lapa (yellow card) 29'; Servania (yellow card) 65'	Stadium: Michael A. Carroll Stadium; Attendance: 6,999; Referee: Jervis Atagana

July 7 12	Atlanta United 2	1–1	Indy Eleven	Kennesaw, GA
7:30 PM EDT	Stanley 73'	Report	Hamilton 64'	Stadium: Fifth Third Bank Stadium; Attendance: 638; Referee: Sergii Demianchuk

July 17 13	Indy Eleven	1–1	Memphis 901 FC	Indianapolis, IN
7:00 PM EDT	Moon 47'	Report	Salazar 51'; Dally (yellow card) 85'	Stadium: Michael A. Carroll Stadium; Attendance: 6,999; Referee: Luis Arroyo

July 24 14	Indy Eleven	1–2	Birmingham Legion FC	Indianapolis, IN
7:00 PM EDT	Kavita 77' (o.g.)	Report	Servania (yellow card) 45+1'; Kasim 54'; A. Crognale (yellow card) 64'; Dean 90+1'	Stadium: Michael A. Carroll Stadium; Attendance: 5,999; Referee: Kevin Fikar

August 4 15	FC Tulsa	0–2	Indy Eleven	Tulsa, OK
8:00 PM EDT		Report	Moon (yellow card) 37'; Arteaga (yellow card) 54'; Wild 79'; Hackshaw (yellow card) 81'; Vassell 85'	Stadium: ONEOK Field; Attendance: 3,099; Referee: Elvis Osmanovic

August 8 16	Atlanta United 2	6–2	Indy Eleven	Kennesaw, GA
7:30 PM	Wolff 1', 6', 50'; Matheus 53'; Macky Diop 58'; Mejia 90+5'	Report	Moon 51'; Vassell 61'	Stadium: Fifth Third Bank Stadium; Attendance: 677; Referee: William Steffen

August 14 17	Indy Eleven	2–1	OKC Energy FC	Indianapolis, IN
6:00 PM CDT	Sissoko (yellow card) 10'; Law 26'; Artega 53', (yellow card) 90+3'; Wild (yellow card) 90+4'	Report	Batista 36'; Adekoya (yellow card) 45'	Stadium: Michael A. Carroll Stadium; Attendance: 5,999; Referee: Joshua Encarnacion

August 18 18	Loudoun United FC	4–1	Indy Eleven	Leesburg, VA
7:00 PM EDT	Sergi 43', 45+1'; Dambrot (yellow card) 47'; Paz 73'; Ku-Dipietro 76'; Saravia (yellow card) 85'; Amoustapha (yellow card) 90+2'	Report	Cochran (yellow card) 33'; Ouimette (yellow card) 34', (goal) 78'; Moon (yellow card) 64'	Stadium: Segra Field; Attendance: 310; Referee: Matthew Franz

August 22 19	Sporting Kansas City II	1–1	Indy Eleven	Kansas City, KS
5:00 PM EDT	Harris 40'; Barber (yellow card) 64'; Dia (yellow card) 88'	Report	Hamilton 51', (yellow card) 58'; Seagrist (yellow card) 69'	Stadium: Children's Mercy Park; Referee: Greg Dopka

August 28 20	Indy Eleven	2–0	Real Monarchs	Indianapolis, IN
7:00 PM EDT	Artega 26', 45+4' (pen.), (yellow card) 79'; Gutjahr (yellow card) 45'; Ayoze (yellow card) 84'	Report	Flores (yellow card) 44'; Adams (yellow card) 79'; Iloski (yellow card) 90+5'	Stadium: Michael A. Carroll Stadium; Attendance: 5,999; Referee: DeShun Beard

September 4 21	Indy Eleven	0–1	Atlanta United 2	Indianapolis, IN
7:00 PM EDT		Report	McFadden 26'; Goodrum (yellow card) 90+4'	Stadium: Michael A. Carroll Stadium; Attendance: 4,999; Referee: Calin Radosav

September 8 22	FC Tulsa	2–1	Indy Eleven	Tulsa, OK
8:00 PM EDT	Marlon 9', (yellow card) 67'; Corrales (yellow card) 51'; Suárez 89' (pen.); Da Costa (yellow card) 90+6'	Report	Arteaga 34'; Haworth (yellow card) 41'; Farr (yellow card) 88'	Stadium: ONEOK Field; Attendance: 2,312; Referee: John Griggs

September 11 23	Indy Eleven	1–0	Sporting Kansas City II	Indianapolis, IN
7:00 PM EDT	Koffie (yellow card) 64'; Wild 77', (yellow card) 89'; Hackshaw (yellow card) 87'	Report	Čuić (yellow card) 90+3'	Stadium: Carroll Stadium; Attendance: 5,999; Referee: Jonathan Bilinski

September 18 24	Indy Eleven	0–2	Louisville City FC	Indianapolis, IN
7:00 PM ET	Hackshaw (yellow card) 57'; Arteaga (yellow card) 60'; Timmer (yellow card) 65'; Farr (yellow card) 71'	Report	DelPiccolo (yellow card) 32'; Hoppenot 41'; Lancaster 69'; McCabe (yellow card) 80'; Souahy (yellow card) 83'	Stadium: Carroll Stadium; Attendance: 6,499; Referee: Jeremy Scheer

September 22 25	Memphis 901 FC	1–0	Indy Eleven	Memphis, TN
7:00 PM CDT	Murphy 31'; Paul (yellow card) 56'; Reynolds (yellow card) 75'; Cropper (yellow card) 90'; Kissiedou (yellow card) 90+6'	Report	Moon (yellow card) 28'	Stadium: AutoZone Park; Attendance: 3,716; Referee: Adam Kilpatrick

September 26 26	OKC Energy FC	2–0	Indy Eleven	Oklahoma City, OK
5:00 PM CDT	Chavez 30'; Daniels 74'; Kurimoto (yellow card) 90+2'	Report	Seagrist (yellow card) 23'; Gutjahr (yellow card) 45+2'; Koffie (yellow card) 70'; Sissoko (yellow card) 90+4'	Stadium: Taft Stadium; Attendance: 1,960; Referee: Kevin Broadley

September 29 27	OKC Energy FC	1–1	Indy Eleven	Oklahoma City, OK
7:30 PM CDT	Chavez (yellow card) 28'; Batista (yellow card) 64'; Cochran (yellow card) 82'; Adekoya 87'; Bijev (yellow card) 90+3'	Report	Arteaga 12', (yellow card) 66', (penalty missed) 82'; Edwards (yellow card) 90+3'	Stadium: Taft Stadium; Attendance: 3,677; Referee: John Matto

October 2 28	Indy Eleven	1–1	Atlanta United 2	Indianapolis, IN
7:00 PM EDT	Ayoze (yellow card) 15'; Wild (yellow card) 25'; Koffie (yellow card) 50'; Arteaga 53'; Seagrist (yellow card) 90+4'; Farr (yellow card) 90+6'	Report	Benítez (yellow card) 67'; Mertz (yellow card) 85'; McFadden 90+5'; Macky Diop (yellow card) 90+6'	Stadium: Michael A. Carroll Stadium; Attendance: 7,999; Referee: Greg Dopka

October 10 29	Birmingham Legion FC	3–1	Indy Eleven	Birmingham, AL
4:00 PM CDT	Brett 8'; Kavita (yellow card) 45'; Vancaeyezeele (yellow card) 54'; E. Crognale 74'; Rufe 90+4', (yellow card) 90+4'	Report	Law 42'	Stadium: BBVA Field; Referee: Sergii Demianchuk

October 16 30	Indy Eleven	1–0	Louisville City FC	Indianapolis, IN
7:00 PM EDT	Arteaga 85'; Buckmaster (yellow card) 90+2'	Report	DelPiccolo (yellow card) 43'; Gómez (yellow card) 78'; McCabe (yellow card) 82'	Stadium: Carroll Stadium; Attendance: 6,499; Referee: Ricardo Fierro

October 23 31	Indy Eleven	1–1	FC Tulsa	Indianapolis, IN
7:00 PM EDT	Arteaga (yellow card) 43'; Vassell 71'; Adewole (yellow card) 77'	Report	Fenwick (yellow card) 32'; Johnson 78'	Stadium: Carroll Stadium; Attendance: 6,499; Referee: Melvin Rivas

October 30 32	Memphis 901 FC	3–0	Indy Eleven	Memphis, TN
7:00 PM CDT	Fortune (yellow card) 7', (goal) 56'; Lamah 12'; Murphy 31'; Reynolds (yellow card) 66'; Carroll (yellow card) 81'	Report	Vassell (yellow card) 25'; Moon (yellow card) 80'; Partida (yellow card) 85'	Stadium: AutoZone Park; Attendance: 4,015; Referee: Matthew Franz

=== U.S. Open Cup ===
On March 29, 2021, the U.S. Soccer Federation announced a truncated format for the 2021 U.S. Open Cup, with 16 clubs participating, entering at the same time in a Round of 16. The format included just four teams from the USL Championship, the four semi-finalists from the 2020 playoffs (El Paso, Louisville, Phoenix, and Tampa). Due to the fact that Indy failed to qualify for the 2020 USLC playoffs, the club was eliminated from the 2021 U.S. Open Cup.

== See also ==
- Indy Eleven
- 2021 in American soccer
- 2021 USL Championship season
