= 2021 Atlanta United 2 season =

Atlanta United 2
2021 season
- Owner: Arthur Blank
- President: Darren Eales
- Head coach: Jack Collison
- Stadium: Fifth Third Bank Stadium
- USL Championship: TBD
- Highest home attendance: League/All: 1,421 (6/9 v. SKC)
- Lowest home attendance: League/All: 638 (7/7 v. IND)
- Average home league attendance: 793
- Biggest win: ATL 5–0 TUL (5/19)
- Biggest defeat: ATL 0–4 BIR (9/22)

The 2021 Atlanta United 2 season was the team's fourth year of existence as well as their fourth season in the USL Championship, the second tier of the American soccer pyramid.

== Players ==
As of August 16, 2021.
The squad of Atlanta United 2 will be composed of an unrestricted number of first-team players on loan to the reserve team, players signed to ATLUTD2, and Atlanta United Academy players. Academy players who appear in matches with ATLUTD2 will retain their college eligibility.

Contracted players
| No. | Position | Nation | Player |
|---|---|---|---|
| 1 | GK | ARG | Rocco Ríos Novo |
| 2 | DF | USA | Aiden McFadden |
| 5 | MF | SEN | Abdoulaye Diop |
| 6 | DF | FRA | Bradley Kamdem |
| 7 | FW | SEN | Amadou Macky Diop |
| 8 | MF | ENG | Chris Allan |
| 9 | FW | USA | Phillip Goodrum |
| 10 | FW | VEN | Darwin Matheus |
| 11 | FW | ENG | Connor Stanley |
| 14 | MF | USA | Robbie Mertz |
| 15 | FW | USA | Alexander Garuba |
| 19 | FW | ARG | Fernando Matías Benítez |

First team players who have been loaned to ATLUTD2
| No. | Position | Nation | Player |
|---|---|---|---|
| 3 | DF | USA | Alex DeJohn |
| 12 | DF | VEN | Ronald Hernández |
| 18 | GK | USA | Ben Lundgaard |
| 20 | MF | BRA | Matheus Rossetto |
| 24 | DF | USA | Josh Bauer |
| 25 | GK | USA | Alec Kann |
| 26 | DF | ENG | Jack Gurr |
| 28 | MF | USA | Tyler Wolff |
| 30 | MF | SSD | Machop Chol |
| 32 | DF | USA | George Campbell |
| 33 | DF | USA | Mikey Ambrose |
| 35 | DF | USA | Efrain Morales |
| 36 | FW | USA | Jackson Conway |

Academy call-ups
| No. | Position | Nat. | Player |
|---|---|---|---|
| 4 | MF | USA | Will Reilly |
| 13 | DF | USA | Caleb Wiley |
| 21 | MF | USA | David Mejia |
| 22 | MF | USA | Coleman Gannon |
| 23 | GK | CHI | Vicente Reyes |
| 34 | MF | USA | Brendan Lambe |
| 39 | MF | USA | Noah Cobb |
| 40 | MF | USA | Danial Sebhatu |
| 41 | MF | USA | Jonantan Villal |

== Player movement ==
=== In ===
| No. | Pos. | Age | Player | Transferred From | Type | Notes | Date | Source |
|---|---|---|---|---|---|---|---|---|
| 14 | MF | 29 | (United States) Robbie Mertz | (United States) Pittsburgh Riverhounds | Transfer | | December 12, 2020 | |
| 1 | GK | 23 | (Argentina) Rocco Ríos Novo | (Argentina) Lanús | Loan | | March 2, 2021 | |
| 8 | MF | 27 | (England) Chris Allan | (United States) University of Charleston | Transfer | | April 2, 2021 | |
| 19 | FW | 25 | (Argentina) Fernando Matías Benítez | (Argentina) River Plate | Loan | | April 2, 2021 | |
| 10 | FW | 24 | (Venezuela) Darwin Matheus | (Venezuela) Zamora | Transfer | | April 2, 2021 | |
| 11 | FW | 24 | (England) Connor Stanley | (England) Manchester United | Loan | | April 2, 2021 | |
| 2 | DF | 27 | (United States) Aiden McFadden | (United States) University of Notre Dame | Transfer | Draft Pick | April 21, 2021 | |
| 15 | FW | 29 | (United States) Alex Garuba | (United States) Oakland Roots SC | Transfer | | April 23, 2021 | |

=== Out ===
| No. | Pos. | Age | Player | Transferred To | Type | Notes | Date | Source |
|---|---|---|---|---|---|---|---|---|
| 3 | DF | 31 | (The Gambia) Modou Jadama | (United States) FC Tulsa | Out of Contract | | December 4, 2020 | |
| 8 | MF | 26 | (Scotland) Daniel Steedman | Free Agent | Option Declined | | December 4, 2020 | |
| 10 | MF | 28 | (United States) Amir Bashti | Free Agent | Out of Contract | | December 4, 2020 | |
| 11 | MF | 30 | (The Gambia) Lamin Jawneh | Free Agent | Option Declined | | December 4, 2020 | |
| 14 | MF | 30 | (The Gambia) Baboucarr Njie | (United States) Rio Grande Valley FC | Option Declined | | December 4, 2020 | |
| 23 | GK | 26 | (United States) Gabriel Rosario | Free Agent | Option Declined | | December 4, 2020 | |
| 31 | DF | 29 | (Denmark) Patrick Nielsen | Free Agent | Out of Contract | | December 4, 2020 | |
| 36 | FW | 24 | (United States) Jackson Conway | (United States) Atlanta United FC | Transfer | HGP | January 1, 2021 | |
| 1 | GK | 30 | (United States) Ben Lundgaard | (United States) Atlanta United FC | Transfer | | March 4, 2021 | |
| 2 | DF | 30 | (England) Jack Gurr | (United States) Atlanta United FC | Transfer | | April 5, 2021 | |

== Competitions ==
=== League table ===
| Pos | Team | Pld | W | L | T | GF | GA | GD | Pts | Qualification |
|---|---|---|---|---|---|---|---|---|---|---|
| 1 | Louisville City FC | 32 | 18 | 7 | 7 | 61 | 37 | +24 | 61 | Advance to USL Championship Playoffs |
| 2 | Birmingham Legion FC | 32 | 18 | 8 | 6 | 51 | 31 | +20 | 60 | Advance to USL Championship Playoffs |
| 3 | Memphis 901 FC | 32 | 14 | 10 | 8 | 47 | 42 | +5 | 50 | Advance to USL Championship Playoffs |
| 4 | FC Tulsa | 32 | 14 | 13 | 5 | 49 | 48 | +1 | 47 | Advance to USL Championship Playoffs |
| 5 | OKC Energy FC | 32 | 8 | 11 | 13 | 30 | 38 | −8 | 37 | |
| 6 | Indy Eleven | 32 | 9 | 15 | 8 | 32 | 47 | −15 | 35 | |
| 7 | Atlanta United 2 | 32 | 8 | 14 | 10 | 47 | 56 | −9 | 34 (Note: The USL awarded a 3–0 win to Atlanta United 2 after Sporting Kansas City II fielded Jake Davis who was an ineligible player. The original score was 1–0 for Sporting Kansas City II.) | |
| 8 | Sporting Kansas City II | 32 | 4 | 20 | 8 | 33 | 64 | −31 | 20 | |

Source: USL

==== Results summary ====
| Overall | | | | | | | | Home | | | | | | Away | | | | | |
| Pld | W | D | L | GF | GA | GD | Pts | W | D | L | GF | GA | GD | W | D | L | GF | GA | GD |
|---|---|---|---|---|---|---|---|---|---|---|---|---|---|---|---|---|---|---|---|
| 24 | 7 | 8 | 9 | 38 | 38 | 0 | 29 | 4 | 6 | 3 | 25 | 17 | +8 | 3 | 2 | 6 | 13 | 21 | −8 |

Last updated: September 16, 2021.
Source: USL

==== Results by matchday ====
| Matchday | 1 | 2 | 3 | 4 | 5 | 6 | 7 | 8 | 9 | 10 | 11 | 12 | 13 | 14 | 15 | 16 | 17 | 18 | 19 | 20 | 21 | 22 | 23 | 24 | 25 | 26 | 27 | 28 | 29 | 30 | 31 | 32 |
|---|---|---|---|---|---|---|---|---|---|---|---|---|---|---|---|---|---|---|---|---|---|---|---|---|---|---|---|---|---|---|---|---|
| Stadium | A | A | A | H | H | H | H | H | A | H | A | H | H | H | A | H | A | H | H | A | A | A | A | H | H | H | A | H | A | A | A | A |
| Result | L | W | D | W | D | L | W | D | L | L | D | D | L | L | W | D | L | W | D | W | L | L | W | D | | | | | | | | |
| Position | 16 | 7 | 7 | 4 | 3 | 8 | 3 | 5 | 7 | 11 | 11 | 10 | 10 | 12 | 10 | 11 | 11 | 7 | 7 | 7 | 10 | 10 | 10 | 12 | | | | | | | | |

Updated to match(es) played on September 16, 2021. Source: USL
A = Away; H = Home; W = Win; D = Draw; L = Loss

==== Matches ====
Win Draw Loss Upcoming

| April 24, 2021 USLC 1 | Louisville City | 2–0 | Atlanta United 2 | Louisville, Kentucky |
| 7:30PM | DelPiccolo 69', 87' | Report | | Stadium: Lynn Family Stadium; Attendance: 7,652 |

| May 1, 2021 USLC 2 | OKC Energy | 0–1 | Atlanta United 2 | Oklahoma City, Oklahoma |
| | | Report | Goodrum 62' | Stadium: Taft Stadium; Attendance: 2,299; Referee: Brandon Stevis |

| May 16, 2021 USLC 3 | OKC Energy | 2–2 | Atlanta United 2 | Oklahoma City, Oklahoma |
| 6:00 PM | Bijev 36'; Osmond 65' | Report | Benítez 56'; Wolff 89' | Stadium: Taft Stadium; Attendance: 1,732; Referee: John Griggs |

| May 19, 2021 USLC 4 | Atlanta United 2 | 5–0 | FC Tulsa | Kennesaw, Georgia |
| | Allan 34'; McFadden 36', 39'; Wolff 45+2'; Gannon 80' | Report | | Stadium: Fifth Third Bank Stadium; Attendance: 650; Referee: Alyssa Nichols |

| May 23, 2021 USLC 5 | Atlanta United 2 | 2–2 | Memphis 901 | Kennesaw, Georgia |
| 3:30 pm | McFadden 28', 90+3' | Report | Dacres 45'; Kissiedou 73' | Stadium: Fifth Third Bank Stadium; Attendance: 643; Referee: Joshua Encarnación |

| May 30, 2021 USLC 6 | Atlanta United 2 | 0–1 | Birmingham Legion | Kennesaw, Georgia |
| 3:30 PM | | Report | Lapa 90+3' (pen.) | Stadium: Fifth Third Bank Stadium; Attendance: 794; Referee: Thomas Snyder |

| June 6, 2021 USLC 7 | Atlanta United 2 | 1–0 | Louisville City | Kennesaw, Georgia |
| 7:30 PM | McFadden 26' | Report | | Stadium: Fifth Third Bank Stadium; Attendance: 835; Referee: Natalie Simon |

| June 9, 2021 USLC 8 | Atlanta United 2 | 2–2 | Sporting Kansas City II | Kennesaw, Georgia |
| 7:30 PM | Kamdem Fewo 67'; Gannon 74' | Report | Mushagalusa 61', 69' | Stadium: Fifth Third Bank Stadium; Attendance: 1,421; Referee: Natalie Simon |

| June 16, 2021 USLC 9 | Memphis 901 | 1–0 | Atlanta United 2 | Memphis, Tennessee |
| 8:30 PM | Thomas 75' | Report | | Stadium: AutoZone Park; Attendance: 5,083; Referee: Jeremy Scheer |

| June 27, 2021 USLC 10 | Atlanta United 2 | 1–2 | OKC Energy | Kennesaw, Georgia |
| 7:30 PM | Benítez 49' | Report | Stephenson 71'; Donovan 78' | Stadium: Fifth Third Bank Stadium; Attendance: 755; Referee: Jervis Atagana |

| July 3, 2021 USLC 11 | Atlanta United 2 | 2–2 | Memphis 901 | Kennesaw, Georgia |
| 7:30 PM | Sebhatu 54'; Matheus 90+4' (pen.) | Report | Murphy 21', 27' | Stadium: Fifth Third Bank Stadium; Attendance: 706; Referee: Joshua Belk |

| July 7, 2021 USLC 12 | Atlanta United 2 | 1–1 | Indy Eleven | Kennesaw, Georgia |
| 7:30 PM | Stanley 73' | Report | Hamilton 64' | Stadium: Fifth Third Bank Stadium; Attendance: 638; Referee: Sergii Demianchuk |

| July 10, 2021 USLC 13 | Atlanta United 2 | 0–1 | Sporting Kansas City II | Kennesaw, Georgia |
| 7:30 PM | | Report | Mushagalusa 38' | Stadium: Fifth Third Bank Stadium; Attendance: 728; Referee: Izlen Peksenar |

| July 17, 2021 USLC 14 | Louisville City | 2–0 | Atlanta United 2 | Louisville, Kentucky |
| 7:30 PM | Matsoso 54'; McLaughlin 63' | Report | | Stadium: Lynn Family Stadium; Referee: Gerald Flores |

| July 28, 2021 USLC 15 | Atlanta United 2 | 2–1 | FC Tulsa | Kennesaw, Georgia |
| 7:30 PM | Macky Diop 25' (pen.); Fortune 49' | Report | da Costa 55' | Stadium: Fifth Third Bank Stadium; Attendance: 769; Referee: Jonathan Bilinski |

| July 31, 2021 USLC 16 | Birmingham Legion | 2–2 | Atlanta United 2 | Birmingham, Alabama |
| 7:30 PM | Brett 66' (pen.); Flemmings 69' | Report | McFadden 35'; Matheus 90+6' | Stadium: BBVA Field; Attendance: 11,105; Referee: John Mattoa |

| August 4, 2021 USLC 17 | Birmingham Legion | 3–1 | Atlanta United 2 | Birmingham, Alabama |
| 8:00 PM | Williams 11'; Lopez 49'; Flemmings 51' | Report | Goodrum 9' | Stadium: BBVA Field; Attendance: 4,301; Referee: Ben Meyer |

| August 8, 2021 USLC 18 | Atlanta United 2 | 6–2 | Indy Eleven | Kennesaw, Georgia |
| 7:30 PM | Wolff 1', 6', 50'; Matheus 53'; Macky Diop 58'; Mejia 90+5' | Report | Moon 51'; Vassell 61' | Stadium: Fifth Third Bank Stadium; Attendance: 677; Referee: William Steffen |

| August 11, 2021 USLC 19 | Atlanta United 2 | 2–2 | OKC Energy | Kennesaw, Georgia |
| 7:30 PM | Mertz 67'; Mejia 90+3' | Report | Bijev 39' (pen.), 76' | Stadium: Fifth Third Bank Stadium; Attendance: 612; Referee: Kyle Johnston |

| August 14, 2021 USLC 20 | Sporting Kansas City II | 1–4 | Atlanta United 2 | Kansas City, Kansas |
| 5:00 PM | Barbir 86' | Report | Matheus 39'; Wolff 47'; Goodrum 54', 74' | Stadium: Children's Mercy Park; Referee: Jon Freemon |

| August 22, 2021 USLC 21 | Pittsburgh Riverhounds | 4–1 | Atlanta United 2 | Pittsburgh, Pennsylvania |
| 7:00 PM | Cicerone 4', 31', 66'; Williamson 26' | Report | Matheus 15' | Stadium: Highmark Stadium; Attendance: 3,177; Referee: Luis Guardia |

| August 28, 2021 USLC 22 | FC Tulsa | 3–1 | Atlanta United 2 | Tulsa, Oklahoma |
| 8:00 PM | Sheldon 14'; Moloto 30', 34' | Report | Chol 17' | Stadium: Oneok Field; Attendance: 3,221; Referee: Laura Rodriguez |

| September 4, 2021 USLC 23 | Indy Eleven | 0–1 | Atlanta United 2 | Indianapolis, Indiana |
| 6:00 PM CDT | | Report | McFadden 26' | Stadium: Michael A. Carroll Stadium; Attendance: 4,999; Referee: Calin Radosav |

| September 15, 2021 USLC 24 | Atlanta United 2 | 1–1 | Charleston Battery | Kennesaw, Georgia |
| 7:30 PM | Conway 11' | Report | Crawford 60' | Stadium: Fifth Third Bank Stadium; Attendance: 620; Referee: Sergii Demianchuk |

| September 18, 2021 USLC 25 | Atlanta United 2 | 0–2 | Tampa Bay Rowdies | Kennesaw, Georgia |
| 7:30 PM | Bauer (yellow card) 28'; Ambrose (yellow card) 71' | Report | Guenzatti 2', 45+1'; Dalgaard (yellow card) 27'; Scarlett (yellow card) 53'; Wyke (yellow card) 77' | Stadium: Fifth Third Bank Stadium; Attendance: 699; Referee: Melvin Rivas |

| September 22, 2021 USLC 26 | Atlanta United 2 | 0–4 | Birmingham Legion | Kennesaw, Georgia |
| 7:30 PM | Conway (yellow card) 47'; Matheus (yellow card) 56'; Kamdem Fewo (yellow card) 88' | Report | Vancaeyezeele 17'; Servania (yellow card) 71'; Brett 78', 90+3'; Kasim 82' | Stadium: Fifth Third Bank Stadium; Attendance: 717; Referee: Luis Arroyo |

| September 25, 2021 USLC 27 | Rio Grande Valley FC Toros | 3–2 | Atlanta United 2 | Edinburg, Texas |
| 7:30 p.m. CDT | Flores (yellow card) 19'; Amoh 30'; Diz 49', (yellow card) 84'; Fjeldberg 65'; Njie (yellow card) 72'; Azócar (yellow card) 90+3'; F> López (yellow card) 90+8'; Ycaza (yellow card) 90+9' | Report | Macky Diop 3'; Kamdem Fewo (yellow card) 26'; Matheus 44' | Stadium: H-E-B Park; Attendance: 3,017; Referee: Ricardo Fierro |

| September 29, 2021 USLC 28 | Atlanta United 2 | 1–1 | Louisville City | Kennesaw, Georgia |
| 7:30 PM | Goodrum (yellow card) 31'; Bauer 40' | Report | Lancaster 51'; Gómez (yellow card) 60'; Davis (yellow card) 84'; DelPiccolo (yellow card) 87' | Stadium: Fifth Third Bank Stadium; Attendance: 680; Referee: John Griggs |

| October 2, 2021 USLC 29 | Indy Eleven | 1–1 | Atlanta United 2 | Indianapolis, Indiana |
| 7:00 PM EDT | Ayoze (yellow card) 15'; Wild (yellow card) 25'; Koffie (yellow card) 50'; Arteaga 53'; Seagrist (yellow card) 90+4'; Farr (yellow card) 90+6' | Report | Benítez (yellow card) 67'; Mertz (yellow card) 85'; McFadden 90+5'; Macky Diop (yellow card) 90+6' | Stadium: Michael A. Carroll Stadium; Attendance: 7,999; Referee: Greg Dopka |

| October 13, 2021 USLC 30 | Sporting Kansas City II | 0–3 | Atlanta United 2 | Kansas City, Kansas |
| 7:00 PM | Davis (yellow card) 44'; Cisneros 69'; Mushagalusa (yellow card) 76' | Report | Bauer (yellow card) 79'; Matheus (yellow card) 90+3' | Stadium: Children's Mercy Park; Referee: Thomas Snyder |
Note: Match forfeited by league to ATL due to Jake Davis' ineligibility (one match suspension for card accumulation).

| October 16, 2021 USLC 31 | Memphis 901 FC | 4–2 | Atlanta United 2 | Memphis, Tennessee |
| 6:00 PM | Segbers (yellow card) 43'; Lamah 50'; Dacres 53'; Murphy 60'; Winn 69' | Report | Macky Diop (yellow card) 37', (goal) 44' (pen.); Fortune 64'; Washington (yellow card) 75' | Stadium: AutoZone Park; Attendance: 4,482; Referee: Gerald Flores |

| October 20, 2021 USLC 32 | FC Tulsa | 4–0 | Atlanta United 2 | Tulsa, Oklahoma |
| 8:00 PM | Da Costa 17'; Johnson 21'; Garcia 23'; Marlon (yellow card) 34'; Wormell (yellow card) 70'; Coutinho 90+1' | Report | Washington (yellow card) 31'; Cobb (yellow card) 83'; McFadden (yellow card) 84' | Stadium: ONEOK Field; Attendance: 2,730; Referee: Mark Allatin |

== Statistics ==
=== Top Scorers ===
As of October 20, 2021

| Place | Position | Name | USLC | Playoffs | Total |
|---|---|---|---|---|---|
| 1 | DF/MF | (United States) Aiden McFadden | 8 | 0 | 8 |
| 2 | MF | (Venezuela) Darwin Matheus | 6 | 0 | 6 |
| 2 | FW | (United States) Tyler Wolff | 6 | 0 | 6 |
| 4 | FW | (United States) Phillip Goodrum | 4 | 0 | 4 |
| 4 | FW | (Senegal) Amadou Macky Diop | 4 | 0 | 4 |
| 5 | FW | (Argentina) Fernando Matías Benítez | 2 | 0 | 2 |
| 5 | MF | (Trinidad and Tobago) Ajani Fortune | 2 | 0 | 2 |
| 5 | MF | (United States) Coleman Gannon | 2 | 0 | 2 |
| 5 | MF | (United States) David Mejia | 2 | 0 | 2 |
| 9 | MF | (England) Chris Allan | 1 | 0 | 1 |
| 9 | MF | (South Sudan) Machop Chol | 1 | 0 | 1 |
| 9 | FW | (United States) Jackson Conway | 1 | 0 | 1 |
| 9 | MF | (Senegal) Abdoulaye Diop | 1 | 0 | 1 |
| 9 | DF | (France) Bradley Kamdem Fewo | 1 | 0 | 1 |
| 9 | MF | (United States) Robbie Mertz | 1 | 0 | 1 |
| 9 | MF | (United States) Danial Sebhatu | 1 | 0 | 1 |
| 9 | MF | (England) Connor Stanley | 1 | 0 | 1 |
| Total | | | 44 | 0 | 44 |

=== Appearances and goals ===
As of October 20, 2020

Numbers after plus-sign(+) denote appearances as a substitute.

| No. | Pos | Nat | Player | Total | | Regular season | | Playoffs | |
| No. | Pos | Nat | Player | Apps | Goals | Apps | Goals | Apps | Goals |
|---|---|---|---|---|---|---|---|---|---|
| 1 | GK | (Argentina) ARG | Rocco Ríos Novo | 20 | 0 | 20 | 0 | 0 | 0 |
| 2 | DF | (United States) USA | Aiden McFadden | 29 | 8 | 27+2 | 8 | 0 | 0 |
| 3 | DF | (United States) USA | Alex DeJohn | 3 | 0 | 3 | 0 | 0 | 0 |
| 4 | FW | (United States) USA | Luke Brennan | 1 | 0 | 1 | 0 | 0 | 0 |
| 4 | MF | (United States) USA | Will Reilly | 10 | 0 | 6+4 | 0 | 0 | 0 |
| 5 | MF | (Senegal) SEN | Abdoulaye Diop | 16 | 1 | 11+5 | 1 | 0 | 0 |
| 6 | DF | (France) FRA | Bradley Kamdem Fewo | 28 | 1 | 22+6 | 1 | 0 | 0 |
| 7 | FW | (Senegal) SEN | Amadou Macky Diop | 19 | 4 | 12+7 | 4 | 0 | 0 |
| 8 | MF | (England) ENG | Chris Allan | 18 | 1 | 17+1 | 1 | 0 | 0 |
| 9 | FW | (United States) USA | Phillip Goodrum | 18 | 4 | 5+13 | 4 | 0 | 0 |
| 10 | MF | (Venezuela) VEN | Darwin Matheus | 31 | 6 | 17+14 | 6 | 0 | 0 |
| 11 | MF | (England) ENG | Connor Stanley | 28 | 1 | 16+12 | 1 | 0 | 0 |
| 12 | DF | (Venezuela) VEN | Ronald Hernández | 2 | 0 | 2 | 0 | 0 | 0 |
| 13 | DF | (United States) USA | Caleb Wiley | 22 | 0 | 22 | 0 | 0 | 0 |
| 14 | MF | (United States) USA | Robbie Mertz | 28 | 1 | 26+2 | 1 | 0 | 0 |
| 15 | FW | (United States) USA | Alex Garuba | 11 | 0 | 1+10 | 0 | 0 | 0 |
| 16 | FW | (Paraguay) PAR | Erik López | 2 | 0 | 2 | 0 | 0 | 0 |
| 18 | GK | (United States) USA | Ben Lundgaard | 4 | 0 | 4 | 0 | 0 | 0 |
| 19 | FW | (Argentina) ARG | Fernando Matías Benítez | 22 | 2 | 14+8 | 2 | 0 | 0 |
| 20 | MF | (Brazil) BRA | Matheus Rossetto | 2 | 0 | 2 | 0 | 0 | 0 |
| 21 | MF | (United States) USA | David Mejia | 16 | 2 | 7+9 | 2 | 0 | 0 |
| 22 | FW | (United States) USA | Coleman Gannon | 6 | 2 | 1+5 | 2 | 0 | 0 |
| 23 | GK | (Chile) CHI | Vicente Reyes | 3 | 0 | 3 | 0 | 0 | 0 |
| 24 | DF | (United States) USA | Josh Bauer | 27 | 0 | 23+4 | 0 | 0 | 0 |
| 25 | GK | (United States) USA | Alec Kann | 5 | 0 | 5 | 0 | 0 | 0 |
| 26 | DF | (United States) USA | Mathieu Brick | 1 | 0 | 0+1 | 0 | 0 | 0 |
| 27 | DF | (United States) USA | Bryce Washington | 21 | 0 | 21 | 0 | 0 | 0 |
| 28 | FW | (United States) USA | Tyler Wolff | 9 | 6 | 9 | 6 | 0 | 0 |
| 30 | FW | (South Sudan) SSD | Machop Chol | 3 | 1 | 3 | 1 | 0 | 0 |
| 32 | DF | (United States) USA | George Campbell | 5 | 0 | 5 | 0 | 0 | 0 |
| 33 | DF | (United States) USA | Mikey Ambrose | 5 | 0 | 5 | 0 | 0 | 0 |
| 34 | MF | (United States) USA | Brendan Lambe | 10 | 0 | 4+6 | 0 | 0 | 0 |
| 35 | DF | (United States) USA | Efrain Morales | 6 | 0 | 2+4 | 0 | 0 | 0 |
| 36 | FW | (United States) USA | Jackson Conway | 6 | 1 | 5+1 | 1 | 0 | 0 |
| 37 | MF | (Trinidad and Tobago) TRI | Ajani Fortune | 23 | 2 | 16+7 | 2 | 0 | 0 |
| 39 | MF | (United States) USA | Noah Cobb | 11 | 0 | 9+2 | 0 | 0 | 0 |
| 40 | MF | (United States) USA | Danial Sebhatu | 5 | 1 | 3+2 | 1 | 0 | 0 |
| 41 | MF | (United States) USA | Jonantan Villal | 2 | 0 | 0+2 | 0 | 0 | 0 |
| 43 | DF | (United States) USA | Nigel Prince | 1 | 0 | 0+1 | 0 | 0 | 0 |
Players who have played for Atlanta United 2 this season but have left the club:
| 26 | DF | (England) ENG | Jack Gurr | 1 | 0 | 1 | 0 | 0 | 0 |
