= 2020 Indy Eleven season =

Indy Eleven
2020 season
- Owner: List: Brian Bauer Don Gottwald Shane Hageman Jeffrey Laborsky Fred Merritt Ersal Ozdemir Quinn Ricker Chris Traylor
- Head coach: Martin Rennie
- USL Championship: Group E: 3rd Eastern Conf.: 9th
- USLC Playoffs: Did not qualify
- U.S. Open Cup: Cancelled
- Highest home attendance: 6,778 (Sept. 5, LOU)
- Lowest home attendance: 4,761 (July 11, STL)
- Average home league attendance: 5,513
- Biggest win: IND 4–1 HFD (July 29)
- Biggest defeat: IND 1–3 LOU (Sept. 5); IND 0–2 LOU (Sept. 16)
| Home colors | Away colors |

The 2020 Indy Eleven season was the club's seventh season of existence, their seventh consecutive season in the second tier of American soccer, and their third season in the league now named the USL Championship. This article covers the period from November 18, 2019, the day after the 2019 USLC Playoff Final, to the conclusion of the 2020 USLC Playoff Final, scheduled for November 12–16, 2020.

== Roster ==
As of August 24, 2020

| No. | Position | Nation | Player |
|---|---|---|---|
| 0 | GK | USA | Jordan Farr |
| 1 | GK | USA | Evan Newton |
| 2 | DF | USA | Conner Antley |
| 4 | MF | USA | Tyler Gibson |
| 5 | DF | AUS | Mitch Osmond |
| 6 | MF | USA | Drew Conner |
| 7 | DF | ESP | Ayoze |
| 8 | MF | ENG | Matt Watson |
| 9 | DF | CAN | Carl Haworth |
| 12 | MF | USA | Patrick McDonald |
| 14 | FW | SRB | Ilija Ilić |
| 15 | DF | TRI | Neveal Hackshaw |
| 16 | DF | FRA | Félicien Dumas |
| 17 | FW | USA | Nick Moon |
| 18 | FW | USA | Jeremy Rafanello |
| 19 | MF | USA | Kenney Walker |
| 20 | DF | CAN | Karl Ouimette |
| 21 | FW | USA | Matthew Roou |
| 22 | MF | USA | Cameron Lindley |
| 23 | FW | CAN | Tyler Pasher |
| 25 | MF | USA | Matthew Senanou |
| 27 | GK | USA | Alex Svetanoff |
| 29 | DF | IRL | Paddy Barrett |
| 30 | FW | USA | Andrew Carleton (on loan from Atlanta United FC) |
| — | MF | USA | Josh Penn |

1. USL Academy Contract

== Competitive ==
=== USL Championship ===
==== Standings — Group E ====
| Pos | Team | Pld | W | D | L | GF | GA | GD | Pts | PPG | Qualification |
|---|---|---|---|---|---|---|---|---|---|---|---|
| 1 | Louisville City FC | 16 | 11 | 2 | 3 | 28 | 12 | +16 | 35 | 2.19 | Advance to USL Championship Playoffs |
| 2 | Saint Louis FC | 16 | 7 | 4 | 5 | 22 | 21 | +1 | 25 | 1.56 | Advance to USL Championship Playoffs |
| 3 | Indy Eleven | 16 | 7 | 2 | 7 | 21 | 19 | +2 | 23 | 1.44 | |
| 4 | Sporting Kansas City II | 16 | 5 | 1 | 10 | 21 | 30 | −9 | 16 | 1.00 | |

Source: USL

==== Match results ====
| March 7, 2020 1 | Memphis 901 FC | 2–4 | Indy Eleven | Memphis, TN |
| 6:00 PM CST | Allen 9'; Burch (yellow card) 12'; Carroll 16'; Muckette (yellow card) 17' | Report | Contreras (yellow card) 11'; Carleton (yellow card) 13'; Ayoze 45+3', (yellow card) 88'; Pasher 69', 72'; Haworth 83' | Stadium: AutoZone Park; Attendance: 8,571; Referee: Matthew Thompson |

| July 11, 2020 2 | Indy Eleven | 2–0 | Saint Louis FC | Indianapolis, IN |
| 7:00 PM EDT | Pasher 52'; Hackshaw 79' | Report | | Stadium: Lucas Oil Stadium; Attendance: 4,761; Referee: Calin Radosav |

| July 18, 2020 3 | Indy Eleven | 2–1 | Sporting Kansas City II | Indianapolis, IN |
| 7:00 PM EDT | Pasher 39'; Haworth (yellow card) 43'; Barrett 67'; Ilić (yellow card) 71'; Antley (yellow card) 90+9' | Report | Čuić (yellow card) 26'; Rad (yellow card) 35'; Riley (yellow card) 40'; Harris 53'; Barbir (yellow card) 82' | Stadium: Lucas Oil Stadium; Attendance: 4,931; Referee: Eric Tattersall |
Note: Match postponed due to the COVID-19 pandemic

| July 22, 2020 4 | Pittsburgh Riverhounds SC | 0–1 | Indy Eleven | Pittsburgh, PA |
| 6:00 PM EDT | Dover (yellow card) 21'; Griffin (yellow card) 63'; Mertz (yellow card) 74'; Mensah (yellow card) 82'; Velarde (yellow card) 90+5' | Report | Ouimette (yellow card) 31'; Barrett (yellow card) 70'; Pasher 90+7' | Stadium: Highmark Stadium; Referee: Eric Tattersall |
Note: Match postponed due to the COVID-19 pandemic Broadcast live on ESPN2

| July 26, 2020 5 | Saint Louis FC | 1–0 | Indy Eleven | Fenton, MO |
| 5:00 PM EDT | Blackwood 24'; Fall (yellow card) 68' | Report | Hackshaw (yellow card) 44' | Stadium: West Community Stadium; Referee: Jervis Atagana |
Note: Match postponed due to the COVID-19 pandemic

| July 29, 2020 6 | Indy Eleven | 4–1 | Hartford Athletic | Indianapolis, IN |
| 7:00 PM EDT | Moon 4'; Pasher 51'; Conner 81'; Watson 87' | Report | Swartz (yellow card) 33'; Davey (yellow card) 45+5'; Dixon 46'; Silva (yellow card) 90+3' | Stadium: Lucas Oil Stadium; Attendance: 4,775; Referee: Lukasz Szpala |
Note: Match postponed due to the COVID-19 pandemic

| August 1, 2020 7 | Indy Eleven | 0–1 | Sporting Kansas City II | Indianapolis, IN |
| 7:00 PM EDT | Ayoze (yellow card) 88'; Osmond (yellow card) 90+7' | Report | Rad (yellow card) 50'; Barbir 70'; Duke (yellow card) 76' | Stadium: Lucas Oil Stadium; Attendance: 5,409; Referee: Youssef Elmessoussi |
Note: Match postponed due to the COVID-19 pandemic

| August 8, 2020 8 | Louisville City FC | 1–1 | Indy Eleven | Louisville, KY |
| 8:00 PM EDT | Williams 3', (yellow card) 77' | Report | Hackshaw (yellow card) 43'; Barrett (yellow card) 55'; Pasher 59' | Stadium: Lynn Family Stadium; Attendance: 4,850; Referee: Calin Radosav |
Note: Match postponed due to the COVID-19 pandemic

| August 15, 2020 9 | Indy Eleven | 1–0 | Pittsburgh Riverhounds SC | Indianapolis, IN |
| 7:00 PM EDT | Pasher 13'; Ayoze (red card) 50'; Watson (yellow card) 62'; Gibson (yellow card) 80'; Moon (yellow card) 86' | Report | Dos Santos (yellow card) 58'; Velarde (yellow card) 81' | Stadium: Lucas Oil Stadium; Attendance: 5,748; Referee: Lukasz Szpala |
Note: Match postponed due to the COVID-19 pandemic

| August 26, 2020 10 | Louisville City FC | 1–0 | Indy Eleven | Louisville, KY |
| 8:00 PM EDT | DelPiccolo 61' | Report | Gibson (yellow card) 37'; Ouimette (yellow card) 75'; Hackshaw (yellow card) 90+7' | Stadium: Lynn Family Stadium; Attendance: 4,851; Referee: Matthew Thompson |
Note: Match postponed due to the COVID-19 pandemic

| September 5, 2020 11 | Indy Eleven | 1–3 | Louisville City FC | Indianapolis, IN |
| 7:00 PM EDT | Ouimette (yellow card) 29'; Pasher 45+6' (pen.) | Report | Williams 23'; Bone 27'; Matsoso 44'; Souahy (yellow card) 45+5'; Totsch (yellow card) 77' | Stadium: Lucas Oil Stadium; Attendance: 6,778; Referee: Elvis Osmanovic |

| September 9, 2020 12 | Indy Eleven | 2–1 | Sporting Kansas City II | Indianapolis, IN |
| 7:00 PM EDT | Barrett (yellow card) 3'; Moon 6'; Rafanello 63'; Conner (yellow card) 86' | Report | Rešetar (yellow card) 23'; Serna (yellow card) 53'; Riley (yellow card) 58'; Davis (yellow card) 59'; Čuić (yellow card) 74'; Freeman 88' | Stadium: Lucas Oil Stadium; Attendance: 5,066; Referee: Ismir Pekmic |

| September 16, 2020 13 | Indy Eleven | 0–2 | Louisville City FC | Indianapolis, IN |
| 7:00 PM EDT | Ouimette (yellow card) 37' | Report | Lancaster 39'; Bone (yellow card) 66', (goal) 76'; DelPiccolo (yellow card) 66'; Hoppenot (yellow card) 73'; Totsch (yellow card) 79' | Stadium: Lucas Oil Stadium; Attendance: 2,500; Referee: Kevin Fikar |

| September 23, 2020 14 | Indy Eleven | 1–1 | Saint Louis FC | Indianapolis, IN |
| 7:00 PM EDT | Conner (yellow card) 55'; Hackshaw (yellow card) 64', (goal) 72'; Barrett (yellow card) 85'; Carleton (yellow card) 89' | Report | Wharton (yellow card) 4' (yellow-red card) 75'; Greig (yellow card) 45'; Adewole (yellow card) 45+2'; Fink (yellow card) 45+4' (yellow-red card) 61'; Cicerone 50' | Stadium: Lucas Oil Stadium; Attendance: 5,664; Referee: Lukasz Szpala |

| September 30, 2020 15 | Indy Eleven | 1–2 | Sporting Kansas City II | Indianapolis, IN |
| 7:00 PM EDT | Lindley (yellow card) 38'; Carleton 49'; Watson (yellow card) 73' | Report | Harris 41'; Sparks (yellow card) 86', (goal) 90+5' | Stadium: Lucas Oil Stadium; Attendance: 6,039; Referee: Calin Radosav |

| October 3, 2020 16 | Saint Louis FC | 2–1 | Indy Eleven | Fenton, MO |
| 8:00 PM EDT | Blackwood (yellow card) 8', (goal) 35'; Cicerone (yellow card) 18'; Fall 47' (pen.); Adewole (yellow card) 69' | Report | Antley (yellow card) 21'; Gibson (yellow card) 45+2'; Barrett (yellow card) 61'; Conner (yellow card) 63'; Pasher 82' (pen.) | Stadium: West Community Stadium; Referee: Tori Penso |

=== U.S. Open Cup ===
As a USL Championship club, Indy will enter the competition in the Second Round, to be played April 7–9.

| April 8 2nd round | Indy Eleven (Indiana) | P–P | Michigan Stars FC | Indianapolis, IN |
| 7:00 pm EDT | | | | Stadium: Carroll Stadium |
Note: Match postponed due to the COVID-19 pandemic
