= Canada men's national soccer team results (unofficial matches) =

- Win Draw Loss

This is a list of the Canada men's national soccer team's unofficial results from their inception to the present day that are not accorded the status of official internationals, not being recognized by FIFA. Player appearances and goals in these matches are also not counted to their totals.

== Exhibition (unofficial) matches ==
Key
Win
Draw
Defeat

=== 1885 ===
November 28, 1885 International friendly	United States	0–1	Canada	Newark, New Jersey, U.S.
			Gibson 7'	Stadium: Our New Thread Athletic Ground; Attendance: 2000-3000; Referee: J. E. Douglas (ONT)

=== 1886 ===
November 25, 1886 International friendly	United States	3–2	Canada	Newark, New Jersey, U.S.
	J. Chapman ~50'; J. McGurck ~55'; Gray 85'		Doll 30', 75'	Stadium: Our New Thread Athletic Ground; Attendance: 2000; Referee: R. Craig (ONT)

=== 1887 ===
May 24, 1887 International friendly	Canada	4–1	United States	Berlin, Ontario
	Thomson 10', 55'; Bowman ?'; Parker 70'	Report	Sargeant 5'	Attendance: 2000; Referee: W. Galt (Toronto)

November 24, 1887 International friendly	United States	0–5	Canada	Newark, New Jersey, U.S.
		Report	Thomson 14', 23'; Brubacher 60', 76'; Gibson ~80'	Stadium: Wright Street Baseball Grounds; Attendance: 2000; Referee: R. Craig (ONT)

=== 1888 ===
May 24, 1888 International friendly	Canada	3–3	United States	Berlin, Ontario
	? ?'	Report	? ?'

September 9, 1888 International friendly	Scotland Selects	4–0	Canada	Glasgow, Scotland
17:30	McCall ?', ?'; Berry 48', ?'			Stadium: Exhibition Grounds; Attendance: 6000; Referee: Charles Campbell

October 6, 1888 International friendly	Manchester United (England)	0–2	Canada	England
		Report	Bowman; Webster
Note: In 1888, Manchester United were known as Newton Heath LYR Football Club.

=== 1909 ===
March 19, 1909 International friendly	Canada	2–1	(England) West Ham United	London, Ontario

=== 1921 ===
July 9, 1921 International friendly	Canada	0–1	Scotland XI	Montreal, Quebec
			?'

=== 1924 ===
August 5, 1924 International friendly	Auckland All-stars (New Zealand)	1–1	Canada	Auckland, New Zealand
	?'		?'

=== 1937 ===
July 16, 1937 International friendly	Trenton Highlanders (United States)	2–3	Canada	Dallas, U.S.
	?'; ?'	Report	Beckwith ?'; Horne ?'; Scholes ?'

July 18, 1937 International friendly	Argentina	8–1	Canada	Dallas, U.S.
		Report	Olander ?'

=== 1956 ===
August 18, 1956 International friendly	Canada	2–1	(Soviet Union) Lokomotiv Moscow	Toronto, Ontario
	?'; ?'		Philley ?'

=== 1960 ===
September 15, 1960 International friendly	Lokomotiv Moscow (Soviet Union)	3–1	Canada	Moscow, Soviet Union
	?'; ?'		Stewart ?'

September 18, 1960 International friendly	Avangard Kharkov (Soviet Union)	2–2	Canada	Kharkov, Soviet Union
	?'; ?'		Hughes ?'; Nicol ?'

September 20, 1960 International friendly	Stalino (Soviet Union)	2–1	Canada	Donetsk, Soviet Union
	?'; ?'

September 24, 1960 International friendly	Zenit Leningrad (Soviet Union)	4–1	Canada	Donetsk, Soviet Union
	?'; ?'; ?'; ?'		Nicol ?'

September 28, 1960 International friendly	Dundee F.C. (Scotland)	9–1	Canada	Dundee, Scotland
			Stewart

October 3, 1960 International friendly	West Bromwich Albion (England)	9–1	Canada	West Bromwich, England
			Hughes ?'

=== 1967 ===
13 June 1967 International friendly	Canada Olympic Team	2–7	Scotland	Winnipeg
	Adams; MacKay	Report	Harper; Hope; Morgan	Stadium: Alexander Park; Attendance: 3,000; Referee: T. Boskovic

=== 1972 ===
September 2, 1972 International friendly	Guatemalan Club (Guatemala)	2–2	Canada	Guatemala City, Guatemala
	?'; ?'		Schiraldi ?'; Young ?'

=== 1973 ===
May 23, 1973 International friendly	Canada	0–1	(England) Arsenal F.C.	Toronto, Ontario
			?'

September 28, 1973 International friendly	Malta Select	2–0	Canada	Valletta, Malta
	?'; ?'

September 30, 1973 International friendly	Malta Select	0–0	Canada	Valletta, Malta

October 3, 1973 International friendly	Copenhagen Select (Denmark)	7–3	Canada	Copenhagen, Denmark
			Batchelor ?'; Schiraldi ?'; S. Lenarduzzi ?'

October 7, 1973 International friendly	Luxembourg	0–2	Canada	Luxembourg, Luxembourg
			Parsons ?'; Schiraldi ?'

October 10, 1973 International friendly	Irish F.A. XI (Northern Ireland)	6–4	Canada	Belfast, Northern Ireland
			Bennett ?'; Douglas ?'; Robinson ?', ?'

=== 1974 ===
October 12, 1974 International friendly	East Germany U-23	5–0	Canada	Neubrandenburg, Germany

October 16, 1974 International friendly	West Germany	1–0	Canada	Wiesbaden, Germany
	?'

=== 1975 ===
July 6, 1975 International friendly	Canada	1–8	Poland	Montreal, Quebec
	Douglas ?'

July 9, 1975 International friendly	Canada	1–4	Poland	Toronto, Ontario
	Bennett ?'

July 29, 1975 International friendly	Canada	0–3	East Germany	Toronto, Ontario
	Bennett ?'

July 31, 1975 International friendly	Canada	1–7	East Germany	Ottawa, Ontario
	Rose 72'

August 6, 1975 International friendly	Canada	1–4	Hungary	Toronto, Ontario
	Roe		?'; ?'; ?'; ?'

August 10, 1975 International friendly	Canada	2–3	Hungary	Montreal, Quebec
	Bolitho ?'; Burke ?'		?'; ?'; ?'

=== 1976 ===
September 8, 1976 International friendly	Canada	1–1	(United States) New York Cosmos	Edmonton, Alberta
	Parsons ?'		?'

September 10, 1976 International friendly	Canada	3–1	(United States) New York Cosmos	Vancouver, British Columbia
	Budd ?'; Thompson ?'; Johnson ?'		?'

=== 1977 ===
September 27, 1977 International friendly	Canada	3–1	(France) Paris St-Germain	Montreal, Quebec
	MacKay ?'; B. Lenarduzzi ?', ?'		?'

=== 1980 ===
September 21, 1980 International friendly	Canada	1–3	(Northern Ireland) Irish League	St. John's, Newfoundland and Labrador
	Gray ?'		?'; ?'; ?'

September 24, 1980 International friendly	Canada	2–1	(Northern Ireland) Irish League	Toronto, Ontario
	Stojanovic ?', ?'		?'

October 5, 1980 International friendly	Canada	2–1	(Peru) Sporting Cristal	Vancouver, British Columbia
	Segota ?'; Stojanovic ?'		?'

October 8, 1980 International friendly	Canada	1–1	(Peru) Sporting Cristal	Calgary, Alberta
	Segota ?'		?'

October 12, 1980 International friendly	Canada	0–0	(Peru) Sporting Cristal	Toronto, Ontario

=== 1981 ===
October 4, 1981 International friendly	Canada	1–1	(United States) New York Cosmos	Calgary, Alberta
	Mitchell ?'		?'

October 7, 1981 International friendly	Canada	4–0	(United States) New York Cosmos	Vancouver, British Columbia
	Stojanovic ?'; Sweetzer ?', ?'; Segota ?'

=== 1983 ===
December 8, 1983 International friendly	Belize	0–2	Canada	Belmopan, Belize
			Pakos ?'; Falzon ?'

=== 1984 ===
June 19, 1984 International friendly	Guangzhou FC (China)	0–1	Canada	Guangzhou, China
			McNally ?'

June 21, 1984 International friendly	Waldhof Mannheim (Germany)	2–0	Canada	Guangzhou, China
			McNally ?'

June 23, 1984 International friendly	Nigeria	1–3	Canada	Guangzhou, China
	?'		Catliff ?', ?'; Lee ?'

June 25, 1984 International friendly	Congo	0–2	Canada	Beijing, China
	Catliff 79'; Pakos ?'

June 27, 1984 International friendly	China	5–1	Canada	Beijing, China
	?'; ?'; ?'; ?'; ?'		Sudeyko 67'

June 30, 1984 International friendly	Poland U-21	5–2	Canada	Tianjin, China
	?'; ?'; ?'; ?'; ?'		Catliff ?', ?'

=== 1985 ===
March 8, 1985 International friendly	Saint Vincent and the Grenadines	1–2	Canada	Kingstown, St. Vincent and the Grenadines
	?'		Pakos ?'; Vrablic ?'

June 4, 1985 International friendly	Central Español (Uruguay)	0–0	Canada	Seoul, South Korea

June 10, 1985 International friendly	South Korea	1–0	Canada	Daegu, South Korea
	?'

June 15, 1985 International friendly	Club Atlético Huracán (Argentina)	1–2	Canada	Seoul, South Korea
	?'		Karpun ?', ?'

August 4, 1985 International friendly	Canada	0–1	(England) Everton	Toronto, Ontario
			?'

=== 1986 ===
March 22, 1986 International friendly	Italy Amateur	1–2	Canada	Terni, Italy
	?'		Lowery ?'; Domazetis ?'

March 25, 1986 International friendly	Italy Amateur	1–1	Canada	Gorizia, Italy
	?'		Domazetis ?'

March 28, 1986 International friendly	San Marino	0–1	Canada	San Marino, San Marino
			Grimes ?'

April 1, 1986 International friendly	Switzerland	1–0	Canada	Lucerne, Switzerland
	?'

=== 1988 ===
June 2, 1988 International friendly	Ecuador	2–1	Canada	Guayaquil, Ecuador
	?'; ?'		?'

=== 1990 ===
May 6, 1990 1990 North American Nations Cup	Canada	1–0	United States B	Burnaby, British Columbia
	Catliff 34'

=== 1991 ===
March 14, 1991 1991 North American Nations Cup	Mexico B	3–0	Canada	Los Angeles, U.S.
	Alves 5', 48'; Duana 53'			Stadium: Los Angeles Memorial Coliseum; Attendance: 3,566; Referee: Rodolfo Martínez (Mexico)

=== 2004 ===
June 5, 2004 International friendly	San Jose Earthquakes (United States)	1–3	Canada	San Jose, U.S.
	?'		Radzinski 23'; Peschisolido 56'; Waibel 48' (o.g.)

July 12, 2004 International friendly	Canada	1–1	(Scotland) Hearts	Burnaby, British Columbia
	Simpson 90'		?'

July 14, 2004 International friendly	Canada	1–0	(England) Millwall	Burnaby, British Columbia
	Occean 5'

=== 2005 ===
January 17, 2005 International friendly	Canada	2–0	Honduras Five Star	Fort Lauderdale, U.S.
	Grande ?' (pen.); Valente ?'

June 7, 2005 International friendly	Canada	5–0	Honduras Five Star	Sunrise, Florida, U.S.
	Jordan ?', ?'; Gerba ?'; Brillant ?'; Leduc ?'

=== 2008 ===
February 2, 2008 International friendly	Canada	2–0	(Denmark) Vejle Boldklub	Fort Lauderdale, U.S.
	Gbeke 10'; Nakajima-Farran 40'

=== 2014 ===
January 21, 2014 International friendly	Fort Lauderdale Strikers (United States)	0–2	Canada	Fort Lauderdale, U.S.
			Bekker ?'; Froese ?'

=== 2019 ===
June 10, 2019 International friendly	Canada	2–0	Trinidad and Tobago	Fullerton, U.S.
	Arfield 5', 90'

=== 2026 ===
January 17 International friendly	Canada	1–0	Guatemala	Los Angeles, United States
19:00 UTC−8	Russell-Rowe 66'	Report		Stadium: BMO Stadium; Referee: Rosendo Mendoza (United States)
Note: The Canadian Soccer Association previously said the match would be a full A-level international; however, the match was later reclassified as a B-level international according to the linked match report.
