= Matías Benítez =

Matías Benítez may refer to:

- Matías Benítez (rugby union) (born 1988), Uruguayan rugby union player
- Matías Benítez (footballer) (born 2000), Argentine footballer
