= 2025 Toronto FC II season =

Toronto FC II
2025 season
- Owner: Maple Leaf Sports & Entertainment
- Manager: Gianni Cimini
- MLS Next Pro: 9th, East (19th overall)
- MLSNP Cup Playoffs: did not qualify

The 2025 Toronto FC II season is the tenth season of play in the club's history and their fourth season in MLS Next Pro.

== Team roster ==
MLS Next Pro allows for up to 35 players on a roster. Roster slots 1 through 24 are reserved for players on professional contracts. The remaining 11 slots are for amateur MLS Academy players (who are unpaid, must be under the age of 21, be part of the team's academy, and have never signed a professional contract or played in the NCAA).

=== Roster ===
As of September 12, 2025

No.	Pos.	Nation	Player
56	MF	CAN	Antone Bossenberry
58	DF	BRA	Ythallo
60	GK	CAN	Nathaniel Abraham
60	GK	CAN	Benjamin Lowry
61	MF	CAN	Tim Fortier
62	FW	CAN	Joshua Nugent
64	FW	JAM	Jahmarie Nolan
67	DF	CAN	Will Caldwell
68	MF	CAN	Lucas Olguin
72	MF	CAN	Mark Fisher
73	DF	CAN	Micah Chisholm
74	MF	USA	Michael Sullivan
75	DF	USA	Reid Fisher
80	GK	CAN	Shafique Wilson
81	MF	TUN	Hassan Ayari
82	MF	USA	Patrick McDonald
85	DF	CAN	Marko Stojadinovic
86	MF	LBR	Joseph Melto Quiah
87	MF	CAN	Costa Iliadis
91	FW	CAN	Dékwon Barrow
92	DF	CAN	Theo Rigopoulos
93	DF	CAN	Pablo Patrick-Galvez
94	DF	CAN	Elijah Roche
96	DF	CAN	Richard Chukwu
98	DF	CAN	Stefan Kapor
—	GK	COL	Felipe Jaramillo (on loan from Vancouver FC)

Toronto FC Academy player

First team players who have been loaned to TFC II in 2025
No.	Position	Nation	Player
19	MF	CAN	Kobe Franklin
25	MF	CAN	Nathaniel Edwards
38	FW	USA	Charlie Sharp
71	MF	CAN	Markus Cimermancic
76	DF	CAN	Lazar Stefanovic
77	GK	USA	Adisa De Rosario
78	MF	CAN	Malik Henry

Toronto FC Academy player
No longer on first team roster

Players no longer on roster
No.	Position	Nation	Player
79	DF	CAN	Andrei Dumitru

== Coaching staff ==
As of November 15, 2022

Coaching staff
Head coach	(Canada) Gianni Cimini
Assistant coach	(Canada) Marco Casalinuovo
Assistant coach	(Canada) Arman Mohammadi
Goalkeeping coach	(Canada) David Monsalve

== Transfers ==
Note: All figures in United States dollars.

=== In ===
==== Transferred In ====
No.	Pos.	Player	From	Fee/notes	Date	Source
58	DF	(Brazil) Ythallo	(Brazil) São Paulo FC		February 27, 2025	
92	DF	(Canada) Theo Rigopoulos	(Canada) Toronto FC Academy	Signed	February 28, 2025	
98	DF	(Canada) Stefan Kapor	(Canada) Toronto FC Academy	Signed	February 28, 2025	
62	FW	(Canada) Joshua Nugent	(Canada) Toronto FC Academy	Signed	February 28, 2025	
78	MF	(Canada) Malik Henry	(United States) Akron Zips	Signed	March 4, 2025	
73	DF	(Canada) Micah Chisholm	Unattached	Signed	March 4, 2025	
75	DF	(United States) Reid Fisher	(United States) San Diego State Aztecs	First team 2025 MLS SuperDraft selection	March 6, 2025	
74	MF	(United States) Michael Sullivan	(United States) Pittsburgh Panthers	First team 2025 MLS SuperDraft selection	March 6, 2025	
82	MF	(United States) Patrick McDonald	(United States) Indiana Hoosiers	First team 2024 MLS SuperDraft selection	March 6, 2025	
86	FW	(Liberia) Joseph Melto Quiah	(United States) Dayton Flyers	First team 2025 MLS SuperDraft selection	March 20, 2025	
64	FW	(Jamaica) Jahmarie Nolan	(Jamaica) Mount Pleasant FA	Transfer	March 24, 2025	

==== Loaned in ====
No.	Pos.	Player	From	Fee/notes	Date	Source
	GK	(Colombia) Felipe Jaramillo	(Canada) Vancouver FC	Loan through 2025	September 12, 2025	

=== Out ===
==== Transferred out ====
No.	Pos.	Player	To	Fee/notes	Date	Source
50	GK	(United States) Abraham Rodriguez		Option declined	November 15, 2024	
74	DF	(Canada) Kundai Mawoko		Option declined	November 15, 2024	
40	GK	(Canada) Adisa De Rosario	(Canada) Toronto FC	Contract expired	November 15, 2024	
82	FW	(Canada) Julian Altobelli	(Canada) York United FC	Contract expired	November 15, 2024	
70	MF	(Canada) Matthew Catavolo	(United States) Fort Wayne FC	Contract expired	November 15, 2024	
89	MF	(England) Charlie Staniland	(England) Sheffield FC	Contract expired	November 15, 2024	
73	FW	(Honduras) Jesús Batiz	(Costa Rica) Cartaginés	Contract expired	November 15, 2024	
73	MF	(Canada) Markus Cimermancic	(Canada) Toronto FC	Promoted to first team	February 21, 2025	
76	DF	(Canada) Lazar Stefanovic	(Canada) Toronto FC	Promoted to first team	February 26, 2025	
78	MF	(Canada) Malik Henry	(Canada) Toronto FC	Promoted to first team	August 9, 2025	
79	MF	(Canada) Andrei Dumitru	(Romania) FC Botoșani	Transfer	August 13, 2025	

== Pre-season and friendlies ==
Win Draw Loss Fixtures

February 7, 2025 Friendly	Toronto FC II	2–0	(Canada) Simcoe County Rovers FC

February 13, 2025 Friendly	Toronto FC II	5–2	(Canada) CS St-Laurent

February 23, 2025 Friendly	Toronto FC II	2–3	(United States) Detroit City FC

March 2, 2025 Friendly	Toronto FC II	0–1	(United States) Syracuse Orange

== Competitions ==
=== MLS Next Pro ===
==== Standings ====
Eastern Conference

Pos	Div	Team	Pld	W	SOW	SOL	L	GF	GA	GD	Pts	Qualification
7	NE	FC Cincinnati 2	28	9	7	0	12	40	41	−1	41	Qualification for the Playoffs
8	SE	Carolina Core FC	28	8	5	5	10	42	44	−2	39	Qualification for the Playoffs
9	NE	Toronto FC II	28	10	2	4	12	34	42	−8	38	
10	SE	Atlanta United 2	28	9	2	7	10	44	43	+1	38	
11	SE	Orlando City B	28	9	4	2	13	38	55	−17	37	

Source: MLSNP
Rules for classification: 1) points; 2) total regulation wins; 3) total goal differential; 4) total goals scored; 5) total shootout wins; 6) away goal differential; 7) away goals scored; 8) home goals differential; 9) home goals scored; 10) fewer disciplinary points; 11) drawing of lots

Overall table

Pos	Div	Team	Pld	W	SOW	SOL	L	GF	GA	GD	Pts
17	SE	Carolina Core FC	28	8	5	5	10	42	44	−2	39
18	PC	Portland Timbers 2	28	10	2	4	12	47	54	−7	38
19	NE	Toronto FC II	28	10	2	4	12	34	42	−8	38
20	SE	Atlanta United 2	28	9	2	7	10	44	43	+1	38
21	FR	Houston Dynamo 2	28	9	4	2	13	40	47	−7	37

Source: MLSNP
Rules for classification: 1) points; 2) total regulation wins; 3) total goal differential; 4) total goals scored; 5) total shootout wins; 6) away goal differential; 7) away goals scored; 8) home goals differential; 9) home goals scored; 10) fewer disciplinary points; 11) drawing of lots

==== Match results ====
March 9, 2025 1	FC Cincinnati 2	0–1	Toronto FC II	Highland Heights, Kentucky
6:00 PM		Report	Edwards 30'	Stadium: NKU Soccer Stadium; Referee: Calin Radosav

March 13, 2025 2	Chicago Fire FC II	1–0	Toronto FC II	Bridgeview, Illinois
8:00 PM	Richards 83'	Report		Stadium: SeatGeek Stadium; Referee: Rachel Swett

March 28, 2025 3	New England Revolution II	4–0	Toronto FC II	Foxborough, Massachusetts
3:00 PM	Marcos Dias 17'; Butts 65', 88'; Escobar 75'	Report		Stadium: Gillette Stadium; Referee: Luis Diego Arroyo

April 10, 2025 4	Inter Miami CF II	0–1	Toronto FC II	Fort Lauderdale, Florida
3:00 PM		Report	Sullivan 80'	Stadium: Chase Stadium; Referee: Erick Lezama Pavon

April 18, 2025 5	Toronto FC II	1–1 (1–4 SO)	Carolina Core FC	Toronto, Ontario
7:00 PM	McDonald 33'	Report	Nzingo 31'	Stadium: York Lions Stadium; Referee: Fabrizio Stasolla
	Shootout
	Ayari (penalty missed); Ythallo (penalty scored); Barrow (penalty missed)		Evans (penalty scored); Sutton (penalty scored); Hadeed (penalty scored); Rodríguez (penalty scored)

April 25, 2025 6	Toronto FC II	2–0	Chicago Fire FC II	Toronto, Ontario
7:00 PM	Barrow 36'; Ayari 84'	Report		Stadium: York Lions Stadium; Referee: Melvin Christopher

May 4, 2025 7	Toronto FC II	3–3 (8–9 SO)	New England Revolution II	Toronto, Ontario
3:00 PM	Stojadinovic 5'; Barrow 63'; Dahlin 78' (o.g.)	Report	Butts 15'; Diarbian 49'; Dias 49' (pen.)	Stadium: York Lions Stadium; Referee: Nivin Raizada
	Shootout
	Sullivan (penalty scored); Ythallo (penalty missed); Iliadis (penalty scored); Bossenberry (penalty missed); R. Fisher (penalty scored); Edwards (penalty scored); Nugent (penalty scored); Barrow (penalty missed); Stojadinovic (penalty scored); Chisholm (penalty scored); De Rosario (penalty scored); Sullivan (penalty missed)		Dias (penalty scored); Diarbian (penalty missed); Souza (penalty scored); Mussenden (penalty scored); Butts (penalty missed); Buck (penalty scored); Siqueira (penalty scored); Emerhi (penalty missed); Villalobos Lopez (penalty scored); Gunn (penalty scored); Dias (penalty scored); Souza (penalty scored)

May 9, 2025 8	Toronto FC II	1–2	Chattanooga FC	Toronto, Ontario
7:00 PM	Nolan 88'	Report	Plougmand 11'; Kwak 44'	Stadium: York Lions Stadium; Referee: Thomas Noel

May 15, 2025 9	New York City FC II	3–0	Toronto FC II	New York City, New York
3:00 PM	Musu 2'; Elias 39'; Lacher 60'	Report		Stadium: Belson Stadium; Referee: Rogelio Alvarez

May 23, 2025 10	Toronto FC II	1–2	Huntsville City FC	Toronto, Ontario
7:00 PM	Ayari 68'	Report	Véliz 32'; Koffi 71'	Stadium: York Lions Stadium; Referee: Melvin Christopher

May 30, 2025 11	Toronto FC II	1–0	Crown Legacy FC	Toronto, Ontario
7:00 PM	Sullivan 58'	Report		Stadium: York Lions Stadium; Referee: Saman Soltani

June 8, 2025 12	FC Cincinnati 2	1–1 (4–2 SO)	Toronto FC II	Highland Heights, Kentucky
6:00 PM	Schaefer 48'	Report	Ayari 75'	Stadium: NKU Soccer Stadium; Referee: Amin Hadzic
	Shootout
	Mangione (penalty scored); Ikoba (penalty scored); Schaefer (penalty scored); Locker (penalty scored)		Sullivan (penalty scored); Iliadis (penalty missed); Ayari (penalty missed); M.Fisher (penalty scored)

June 12, 2025 13	Toronto FC II	2–0	Inter Miami CF II	Toronto, Ontario
7:00 PM	Chisholm 11'; Stojadinovic 43'	Report		Stadium: York Lions Stadium; Referee: Nivin Raizada

June 25, 2025 14	Orlando City SC B	1–2	Toronto FC II	Kissimmee, Florida
7:00 PM	Abdellaoui 40'	Report	Ayari 4'; Bossenberry 79'	Stadium: Osceola Heritage Park; Referee: Russell Miller

July 6, 2025 15	Philadelphia Union II	5–0	Toronto FC II	Chester, Pennsylvania
4:00 PM	Anderson 27'; Olney 63'; Vazquez 77'; Jakupovic 90+4', 90+14'	Report		Stadium: Subaru Park; Referee: Danielle Chesky

July 11, 2025 16	Toronto FC II	2–2 (3–4 SO)	New York Red Bulls II	Toronto, Ontario
7:00 PM	Ayari 18'; Nugent 36'	Report	Mosquera 73'; Rosborough 90+6'	Stadium: York Lions Stadium; Referee: Niko Jecanski
	Shootout
	McDonald (penalty scored); Sullivan (penalty missed); Edwards (penalty scored); Chisholm (penalty missed); Nolan (penalty scored)		Kasule (penalty scored); Mosquera (penalty scored); Mitchell (penalty scored); Nelich (penalty missed); Rosborough (penalty scored)

July 16, 2025 17	New York City FC II	1–0	Toronto FC II	New York City, New York
7:30 PM	Guarino 53'	Report		Stadium: Belson Stadium; Referee: Andrew Porada

July 20, 2025 18	Toronto FC II	2–3	Chicago Fire FC II	Toronto, Ontario
3:00 PM	Sharp 6'; Diouf 49' (o.g.)	Report	Cassano 23'; Shokalook 72', 75' (pen.)	Stadium: York Lions Stadium; Referee: Melvin Christopher

July 27, 2025 19	Columbus Crew 2	1–2	Toronto FC II	Columbus, Ohio
6:00 PM	Rincón 59'	Report	Rogers 64' (o.g.); Edwards 68'	Stadium: Historic Crew Stadium; Referee: Ryan Shanklin

August 2, 2025 20	Chattanooga FC	1–2	Toronto FC II	Chattanooga, Tennessee
7:00 PM	Naglestad 45'	Report	Cimermancic 49'; Ayari 73'	Stadium: Finley Stadium; Referee: Taylor Bowen

August 8, 2025 21	Toronto FC II	1–3	Atlanta United FC 2	Toronto, Ontario
7:00 PM	Cimermancic 69'	Report	Weah 7'; Carmichael 20'; Neri 61'	Stadium: York Lions Stadium; Referee: Nicolas Melita

August 15, 2025 22	Toronto FC II	1–0	FC Cincinnati 2	Toronto, Ontario
7:00 PM	Adnan 58' (o.g.)	Report		Stadium: York Lions Stadium; Referee: Youcef Boumsied

August 20, 2025 23	Philadelphia Union II	2–2 (7–8 SO)	Toronto FC II	Chester, Pennsylvania
7:00 PM	LeBlanc 14'; Griffin 45'	Report	Bossenberry 3'; Sullivan 51'	Stadium: Subaru Park; Referee: Marie Durr
	Shootout
	Korzeniowski (penalty scored); Pierre (penalty missed); Anderson (penalty scored); Jakupovic (penalty scored); Ferreira (penalty scored); Griffin (penalty scored); Uzcátegui (penalty scored); Soria (penalty scored); Pariano (penalty missed)		McDonald (penalty scored); Sullivan (penalty missed); M.Fisher (penalty scored); Iliadis (penalty scored); Ayari (penalty scored); R.Fisher (penalty scored); Stojadinovic (penalty scored); Barrow (penalty scored); Bossenberry (penalty scored)

August 31, 2025 24	Toronto FC II	3–0	New York City FC II	Toronto, Ontario
3:00 PM	Edwards 23'; Cimermancic 47', 68'	Report		Stadium: York Lions Stadium; Referee: Melvin Christopher

September 12, 2025 25	New England Revolution II	2–1	Toronto FC II	Foxborough, Massachusetts
1:00 PM	Hutchinson 24'; Diarbian 56'	Report	McDonald 69' (pen.)	Stadium: Gillette Stadium; Referee: Muhammad Hassan

September 19, 2025 26	Toronto FC II	0–0 (4–3 SO)	Columbus Crew 2	Toronto, Ontario
7:00 PM				Stadium: York Lions Stadium; Referee: Nicolas Melita
	Shootout
	McDonald (penalty scored); M.Fisher (penalty scored); Ayari (penalty scored); Chisholm (penalty scored)		Adu-Gyamfi (penalty scored); Rogers (penalty scored); Adams (penalty missed); Sy (penalty scored); Koné (penalty missed)

September 26, 2025 27	Toronto FC II	1–2	Philadelphia Union II	Toronto, Ontario
7:00 PM	M.Fisher 28' (pen.)	Report	Korzeniowski 45+1'; Benítez 84'	Stadium: York Lions Stadium; Referee: Niko Jecanski

October 5, 2025 28	New York Red Bulls II	2–1	Toronto FC II	Montclair, New Jersey
1:00 PM	Rojas 72', 85'	Report	Sullivan 83'	Stadium: MSU Soccer Park at Pittser Field; Referee: Joshua Encarnación

== Statistics ==
=== Goals ===
Rank	Nation	Player	MLS Next Pro	Playoffs	Total
1	(Tunisia)	Hassan Ayari	6	-	6
2	(United States)	Markus Cimermancic	4	-	4
2	(United States)	Michael Sullivan	4	-	4
3	(Canada)	Nathaniel Edwards	3	-	3
5	(Canada)	Dékwon Barrow	2	-	2
5	(Canada)	Antone Bossenberry	2	-	2
5	(United States)	Patrick McDonald	2	-	2
5	(Canada)	Marko Stojadinovic	2	-	2
9	(Canada)	Micah Chisholm	1	-	1
9	(United States)	Mark Fisher	1	-	1
9	(Jamaica)	Jahmarie Nolan	1	-	1
9	(Canada)	Joshua Nugent	1	-	1
9	(United States)	Charlie Sharp	1	-	1
Own goals			4	0	4
Totals			34	0	34

Updated to match played October 5, 2025
Source: Stats Crew

Out on loan for remainder of the season

=== Shutouts ===
Rank	Nation	Player	Pos.	MLS Next Pro	Playoffs	Total
1	(Canada)	Adisa De Rosario	GK	8	-	8
Totals				8	0	8

Updated to match played September 19, 2025
Source: Stats Crew
