= Connor Stanley =

Connor Stanley may refer to:

- Connor Stanley (footballer), English footballer
- Connor Stanley (EastEnders), an EastEnders character
