= Karl Ouimette =

Canadian soccer player

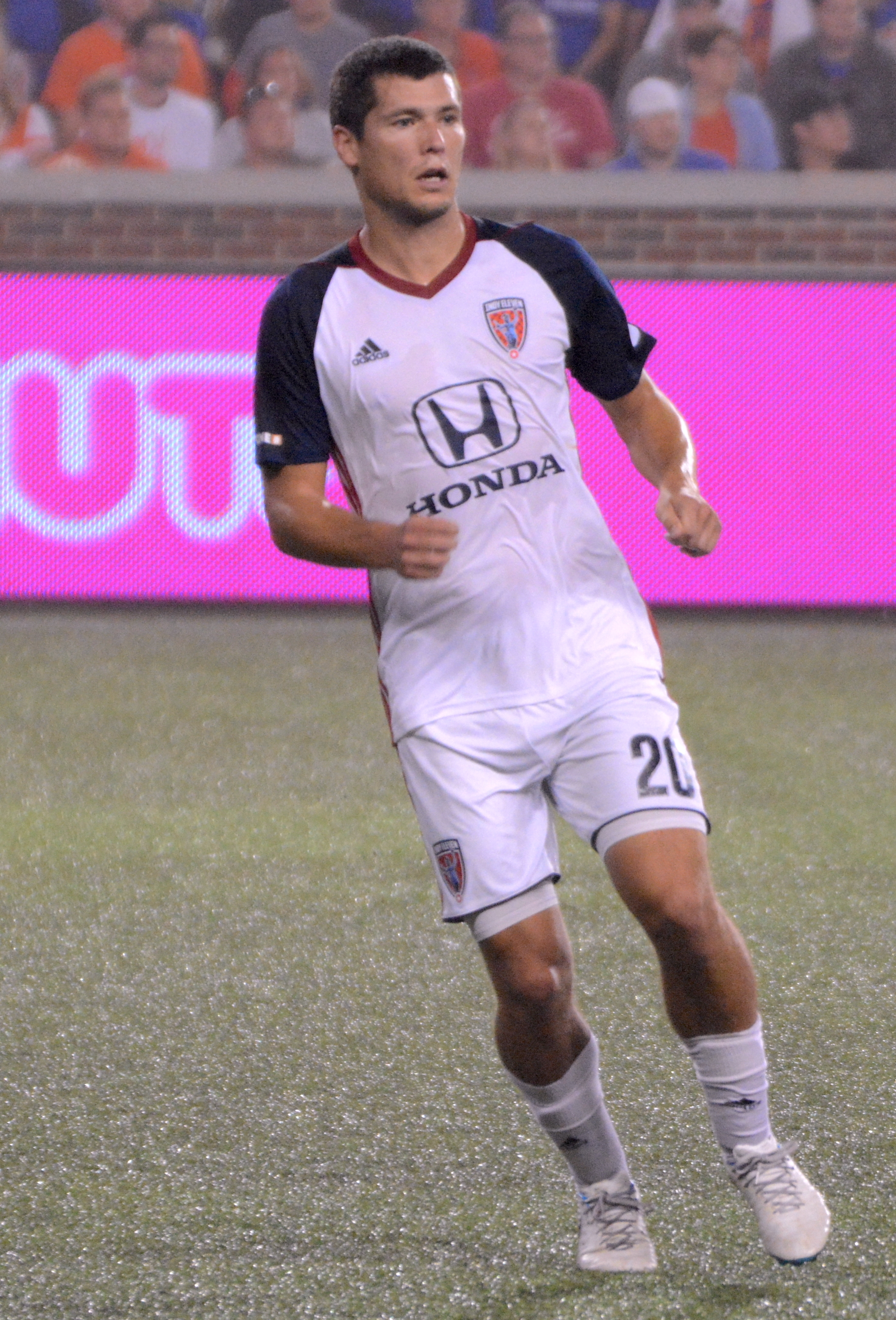
- Ouimette with Indy Eleven in 2018

Personal information
- Full name: Karl William Ouimette
- Date of birth: June 18, 1992 (age 34)
- Place of birth: Repentigny, Quebec, Canada
- Height: 1.83 m (6 ft 0 in)
- Position: Defender

Youth career
- 2009–2010: Trois-Rivières Attak
- 2010–2012: Montreal Impact

Senior career*
Years	Team	Apps	(Gls)
2009	Trois-Rivières Attak	22	(1)
2012–2014	Montreal Impact	20	(1)
2015–2016	New York Red Bulls	18	(0)
2015–2016	→ New York Red Bulls II (loan)	6	(0)
2016	→ Jacksonville Armada (loan)	7	(0)
2017	San Francisco Deltas	23	(0)
2018–2022	Indy Eleven	100	(7)
2022	→ Detroit City (loan)	15	(0)
2023	Atlético Ottawa	25	(0)
2024–	Celtix du Haut-Richelieu	7	(0)

International career^{‡}
2009	Canada U17	3	(0)
2011	Canada U20	2	(0)
2013–2016	Canada	18	(0)
- * Club domestic league appearances and goals as of September 8, 2024 ‡ National team caps and goals as of November 11, 2016

Karl William Ouimette (born June 18, 1992) is a Canadian professional soccer player who plays as a defender for Celtix du Haut-Richelieu in Ligue1 Québec.

== Club career ==
=== Early career ===
Ouimette played in Quebec's top amateur circuit in 2008 with the Conquerants de Laval and would receive the league's top defender award.

In the following season, he secured a contract with the Trois-Rivières Attak, an affiliate of the Montreal Impact, in the Canadian Soccer League. In his debut season in the inter-provincial league, he helped the club secure their second divisional title. Trois-Rivières' opponents in the first round of the playoffs were Portugal FC, where in the opening match Ouimette contributed a goal. The Attak would advance to the next round after defeating the Toronto-based club in a two-game series. The club reached the championship finals after defeating the Italia Shooters in the next round. Ouimette would start in the championship final match against the Serbian White Eagles, where Trois-Rivières defeated the reigning champions in a penalty shootout. Throughout the 2009 season, he made 22 appearances and recorded 1 goal.

In 2010, he joined Montreal Impact's academy in the league's first division. Ouimette would receive the captaincy for the 2011 season. He would assist the club in securing a playoff berth, and they were eliminated in the quarterfinal round of the postseason by Capital City. His final term with the academy occurred during the 2012 season, as he saw action with both the senior team and the academy throughout the campaign. The academy side clinched a playoff berth by finishing second in the division. He would also make his second championship appearance, where Toronto Croatia defeated Montreal for the title.

=== Montreal Impact ===
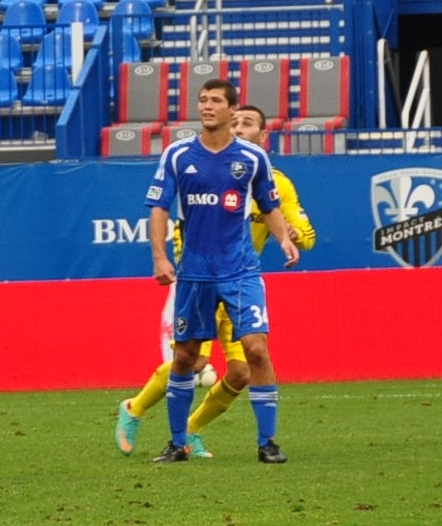
Ouimette playing for Montreal Impact

On July 5, 2012, Ouimette signed a professional contract with the Montreal Impact, making him the first Academy player to sign with the senior squad. A couple of weeks after being signed, Ouimette made his professional soccer debut in a league match against the Houston Dynamo. Ouimette came on as a substitute for Zarek Valentin in the 26th minute. Montreal went on to lose the match 3–0.

On October 19, 2013, Karl Ouimette scored his first MLS goal and game-winner in a comeback 2–1 victory over the Philadelphia Union. The goal proved to be decisive, allowing the Montreal Impact to enter the MLS Cup playoffs for the first time in the team's history. Ouimette also started both legs of the 2014 Canadian Championship, helping the club to its second straight Canadian title. On February 6, 2015, Ouimette was waived by Montreal, effectively ending his time with the Impact.

=== New York Red Bulls ===
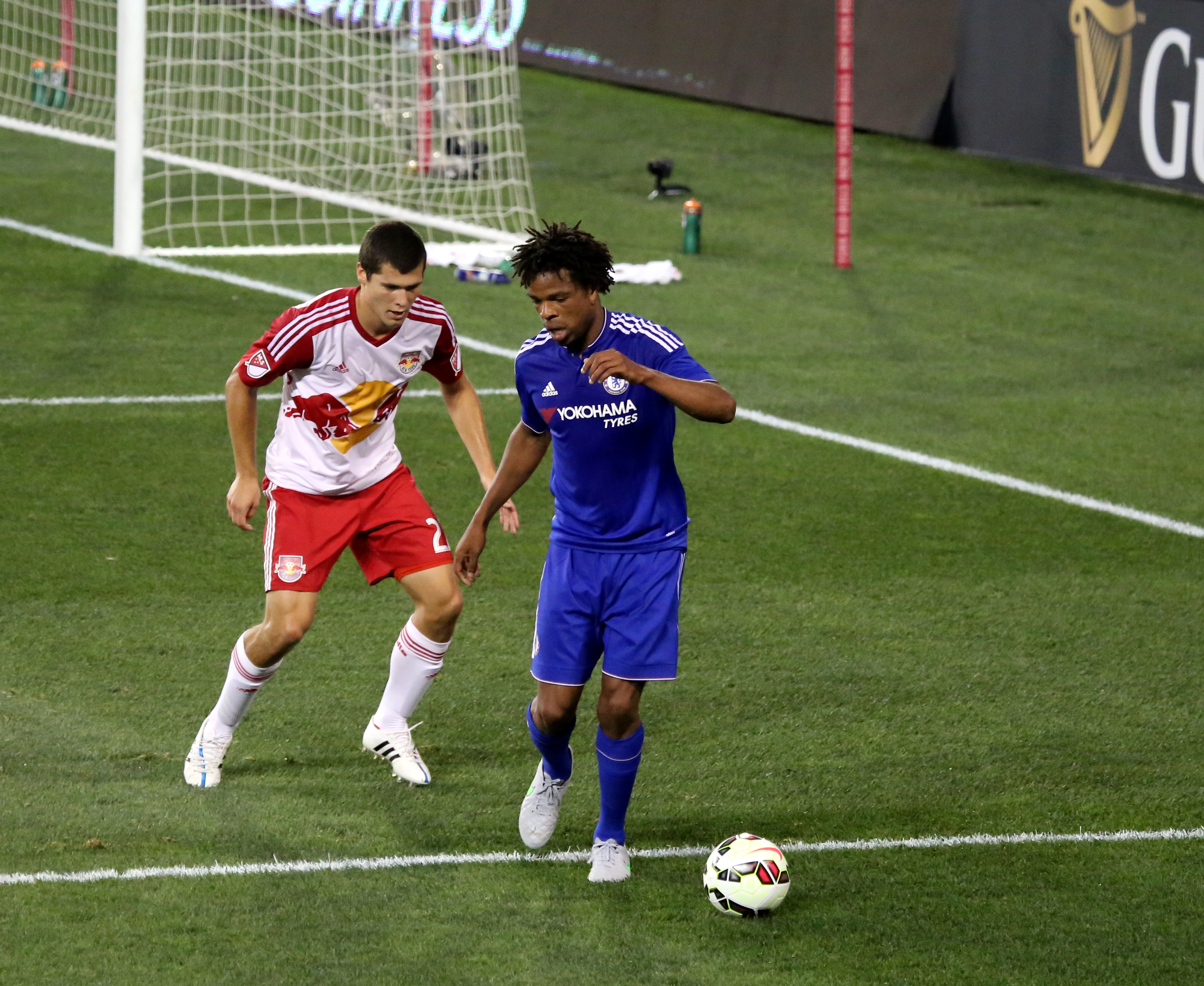
Ouimette with New York Red Bulls in 2015

After an extended trial with MLS side New York Red Bulls, Ouimette was signed to a deal on March 4, 2015. The move reunited him with former Impact coach, Jesse Marsch. Ouimette's debut for the Red Bulls first team came against the New England Revolution on May 2, 2015.

Ouimette was loaned to affiliate side New York Red Bulls II during the 2015 season and made his debut for the side as part of the starting eleven on April 4, 2015, in a 4–1 victory over Toronto FC II, the first victory in club history. On June 23, 2015, Ouimette was selected to the USL Team of the Week for his performance for NYRBII in a 2–0 victory over Louisville City FC. On September 26, 2015, Ouimette scored two goals in extra time to help New York Red Bulls II to a 4–2 victory over Pittsburgh Riverhounds, advancing New York in the 2015 USL Playoffs.

Ouimette was released by the Red Bulls at the end of the 2016 season.

==== Jacksonville Armada (loan) ====
On June 24, 2016, Ouimette joined Jacksonville Armada on loan until the end of the 2016 season.

=== San Francisco Deltas ===
In January 2017, Ouimette signed with San Francisco Deltas of the NASL. Ouimette would win the 2017 Soccer Bowl with the Deltas in their inaugural season. The Deltas would cease operations three days after winning the Soccer Bowl, leaving Ouimette to look for a new club.

=== Indy Eleven ===
On February 2, 2018, Ouimette signed with the USL side Indy Eleven for the 2018 season. In 2018, Ouimette would make 32 starts for the club, playing the most minutes with 2842, and would score three goals. In 2019, he would make 29 starts for the club in 2019, and score three goals, including a playoff goal against New York Red Bulls II. He would re-sign for a third season with the club in 2020, and for a fourth season with the club in 2021. Ouimette would be named vice-captain for the 2021 season, and would play in his 100th game with the club during the season. In November 2021, it was announced that Ouimette would return for a fifth season with Indy Eleven. On March 19, 2022, Ouimette became the first player in Indy Eleven history to earn 100 starts with his selection in a 2-0 loss to the Tampa Bay Rowdies. He was released by Indy Eleven on November 30, 2022, following the conclusion of the 2022 season.

==== Detroit City FC (loan) ====
On May 2, 2022, Detroit City FC announced its acquisition of Ouimette on loan from Indy Eleven for the remainder of the 2022 USL Championship season.

=== Atlético Ottawa ===
On January 31, 2023, Atlético Ottawa announced Ouimette had signed a two-year contract with the club ahead of the 2023 Canadian Premier League season. Ahead of the 2024 season, he announced his retirement, mutually terminating the final year of his contract, and joined the club's executive staff as a Business Development Executive.

== International career ==
On November 8, 2013, Ouimette received his first call up to the Canada national team by head coach Benito Floro for two friendlies against Czech Republic on November 15 and Slovenia on November 19, 2013. He received his first cap as a substitute against Slovenia. He was substituted into Canada's September 9, 2014 match against Jamaica in the 88th minute. The match was dedicated to his sister, Julie, who died a few days earlier after a 12-year battle with Philadelphia chromosome-positive acute lymphoblastic leukemia.

== Career statistics ==
=== Club ===
As of October 7, 2023

Club	Season	League			Playoffs		Domestic Cup		Continental		Total	
Club	Season	Division	Apps	Goals	Apps	Goals	Apps	Goals	Apps	Goals	Apps	Goals
Montreal Impact	2012	MLS	2	0	–		0	0	–		2	0
Montreal Impact	2013	MLS	7	1	0	0	1	0	1	0	9	1
Montreal Impact	2014	MLS	11	0	–		4	0	2	0	17	0
Montreal Impact	Total		20	1	0	0	5	0	3	0	28	1
New York Red Bulls II	2015	USL	5	0	1	2	0	0	–		6	2
New York Red Bulls II	2016	USL	1	0	0	0	–		–		1	0
New York Red Bulls II	Total		6	0	1	2	0	0	0	0	7	2
New York Red Bulls	2015	MLS	11	0	0	0	0	0	–		11	0
New York Red Bulls	2016	MLS	7	0	0	0	0	0	0	0	7	0
New York Red Bulls	Total		18	0	0	0	0	0	0	0	18	0
Jacksonville Armada (loan)	2016	NASL	7	0	–		0	0	–		7	0
San Francisco Deltas	2017	NASL	23	0	2	0	1	0	–		26	0
Indy Eleven	2018	USL	31	3	1	0	1	0	–		33	3
Indy Eleven	2019	USL Championship	27	2	3	1	2	0	–		32	3
Indy Eleven	2020	USL Championship	15	0	0	0	0	0	–		15	0
Indy Eleven	2021	USL Championship	25	2	0	0	0	0	–		25	2
Indy Eleven	2022	USL Championship	2	0	0	0	1	0	–		3	0
Indy Eleven	Total		100	7	4	1	4	0	0	0	108	8
Detroit City FC (loan)	2022	USL Championship	15	0	0	0	0	0	0	0	15	0
Atlético Ottawa	2023	Canadian Premier League	25	0	–		2	0	–		27	0
Celtix du Haut-Richelieu	2024	Ligue1 Québec	7	0	–		–		–		7	0
Career total			221	8	7	3	10	0	3	0	241	11

=== International ===
As of November 11, 2016

Canada
Year	Apps	Goals
2013	1	0
2014	3	0
2015	10	0
2016	4	0
Total	18	0

== Honors ==
=== Club ===
Trois-Rivières Attak

- CSL Championship: 2009
- Canadian Soccer League National Division: 2009

Montreal Impact

- Canadian Championship: 2013, 2014

New York Red Bulls

- MLS Supporters' Shield: 2015

Montreal Impact Academy

- CSL Championship Runners-up: 2012
