= Jordan Hamilton (soccer) =

Canadian soccer player

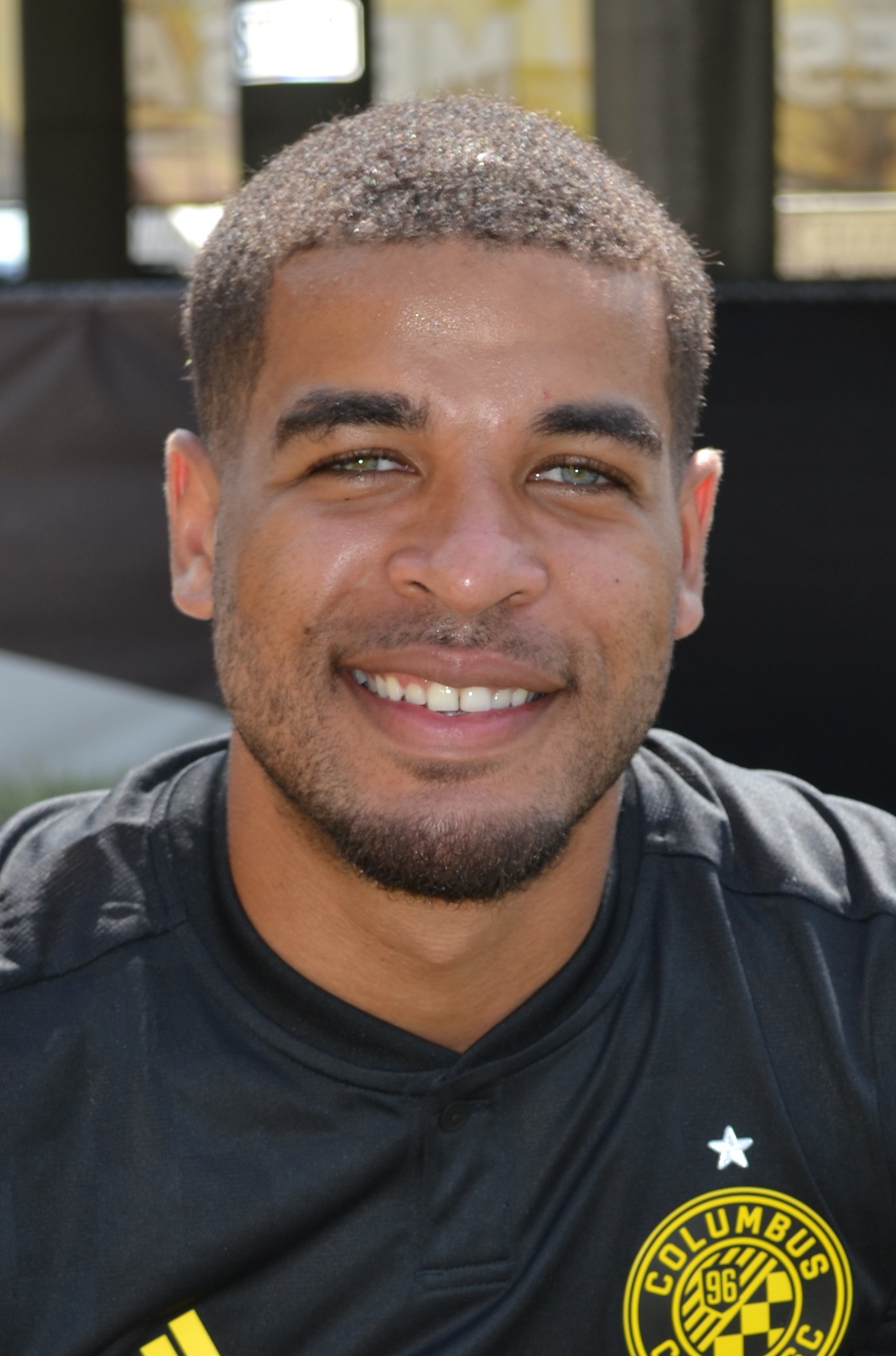
- Hamilton with Columbus Crew SC in 2019

Personal information
- Full name: Jordan Patrick Dear Hamilton
- Date of birth: March 17, 1996 (age 30)
- Place of birth: Scarborough, Ontario, Canada
- Height: 1.83 m (6 ft 0 in)
- Position: Forward

Team information
- Current team: Shan United

Youth career
- North Scarborough SC
- Ajax SC
- 2011–2014: Toronto FC

Senior career*
Years	Team	Apps	(Gls)
2014–2019	Toronto FC	53	(11)
2015–2019	→ Toronto FC II (loan)	44	(17)
2014	→ Wilmington Hammerheads (loan)	11	(5)
2014	→ Trofense (loan)	4	(0)
2019–2020	Columbus Crew	6	(0)
2021	Indy Eleven	18	(5)
2022	Sligo Rovers	13	(2)
2022–2024	Forge FC	53	(5)
2025–	Shan United	10	(5)

International career
2011–2013	Canada U17	11	(5)
2014–2015	Canada U20	5	(3)
2016–2017	Canada U23	4	(3)
2014–2016	Canada	2	(0)
- * Club domestic league appearances and goals as of 19:59, 25 January 2026 (UTC)

Jordan Patrick Dear Hamilton (born March 17, 1996) is a Canadian soccer player who plays as a forward for Shan United in the Myanmar National League.

== Early life ==
Hamilton was born on 17 March 1996. Born in Scarborough, Ontario, Canada, he is a native of the city. He started playing with North Scarborough SC, before switching to Ajax SC. He made his U14 Ontario Provincial debut at the U14 All-Star Championships in Sherbrooke, Quebec. He scored 8 seconds into their first match against the U14 PEI team, when they had the kickoff. He went on to score 6 more goals in the match. Afterwards, he joined the Toronto FC Academy. He almost attended the University of Maryland, College Park in the United States.

== Club career ==
=== Toronto FC ===
After three years playing with the TFC Academy in the Canadian Soccer League, Hamilton signed with Toronto FC on January 6, 2014. Hamilton made his professional debut as a late substitute in 0–1 defeat to Colorado Rapids on April 12, 2014. He was loaned to USL Pro club Wilmington Hammerheads FC on May 1, 2014.

After 5 goals in 11 games with Wilmington and a goal for Toronto in a friendly against Tottenham Hotspur, Hamilton was loaned to C.D. Trofense of the Portuguese Segunda Liga. On August 9, 2014, Hamilton made his first appearance for side C.D. Trofense as a 66th-minute substitute. He was recalled from his loan by Toronto on December 12.

On March 20, 2015 Hamilton was loaned to Toronto FC II ahead of their inaugural season in the USL. He made his debut against the Charleston Battery on March 21, and scored Toronto FC II's first ever goal in the same match in the 8th minute.

Hamilton scored his first two goals for Toronto FC in the 2016 Canadian Championship, when he got a brace in the first leg against the Montreal Impact. He scored his first MLS goal on June 26 against Orlando City. He finished the 2016 season with three goals in 14 league matches and two goals in four Canadian Championship matches. He had also made four appearances for Toronto FC II.

=== Columbus Crew SC ===
On July 11, 2019 Hamilton was traded to Columbus Crew SC along with an international roster slot and $50,000 of Targeted Allocation money, in exchange for forward Patrick Mullins and an undisclosed amount of Conditional Allocation money. Hamilton would have his option for the 2020 season declined by the Crew, but re-signed with the club soon after for 2020. He helped the club win the MLS Cup 2020 while playing for them. The club declined his option for the 2021 season.

=== Indy Eleven ===
On March 1, 2021, he signed with USL Championship side Indy Eleven. On September 2, 2021, Hamilton and Indy mutually agreed to terminate his contract at the club.

=== Sligo Rovers ===
In February 2022, Hamilton would sign with League of Ireland Premier Division club Sligo Rovers for the 2022 season. In June 2022, it was announced that Hamilton would leave the club by mutual consent.

=== Forge FC ===
On August 5, 2022, Hamilton signed a multi-year contract with Forge FC of the Canadian Premier League. He made his debut the next day against the HFX Wanderers. Hamilton scored his first goal for Forge on August 12 against Cavalry FC. In October 2023, he helped Forge win their fourth league title, following a 2–1 win over Cavalry FC in the play-off final.

=== Shan United ===
In May 2025, Hamilton signed with Myanmar National League club Shan United.

== International career ==
=== Youth ===
Hamilton represented Canada at the 2013 FIFA U-17 World Cup.

In November 2014, Hamilton was called up to the U-20 team for a series of games. He scored a goal against England's U-20 side during a friendly on November 12 in a 2–2 draw. Hamilton followed it up three days later with another goal in a 2–1 victory over Russia's U-21 team. Hamilton would later participate in the 2015 CONCACAF U-20 Championship with Canada. He scored three goals at the tournament, a brace against Haiti in the first game, and a goal against Honduras in Canada's last game.

In May 2016, Hamilton was called to Canada's U23 national team for a pair of friendlies against Guyana and Grenada. He scored in both matches. In 2017, he scored against Qatar U23 at the Aspire U23 tournament.

=== Senior ===
Hamilton's first experience with the senior side was when he was called up for a training camp in January 2014 with the Canadian senior team. Hamilton made his debut for Canada against Colombia as a substitute on October 14, 2014.

== Style of play ==
Hamilton plays as a forward. He is left-footed.

== Personal life ==
Hamilton attended Blessed Pope John Paul II Catholic Secondary School in Scarborough.

== Career statistics ==
=== Club ===
As of November 9, 2024

Appearances and goals by club, season and competition
Club	Season	League			Playoffs		Domestic Cup (Note: Includes the Canadian Championship, U.S. Open Cup and FAI Cup)		League Cup (Note: All appearances in the Taça da Liga)		Continental (Note: Includes the CONCACAF Champions League and the UEFA Europa Conference League)		Total	
Club	Season	Division	Apps	Goals	Apps	Goals	Apps	Goals	Apps	Goals	Apps	Goals	Apps	Goals
Toronto FC	2014	MLS	1	0	–		0	0	–		–		1	0
Toronto FC	2015	MLS	2	0	0	0	0	0	–		–		2	0
Toronto FC	2016	MLS	14	3	0	0	4	2	–		–		18	5
Toronto FC	2017	MLS	8	2	0	0	3	0	–		–		11	2
Toronto FC	2018	MLS	14	2	–		2	1	–		3	0	19	3
Toronto FC	2019	MLS	14	4	0	0	0	0	–		1	1	15	5
Toronto FC	Total		53	11	0	0	9	3	0	0	4	1	66	15
Wilmington Hammerheads (loan)	2014	USL Pro	11	5	0	0	1	0	–		–		12	5
Trofense (loan)	2014–15	Segunda Liga	5	0	–		0	0	2	0	–		7	0
Toronto FC II (loan)	2015	USL	20	3	–		–		–		–		20	3
Toronto FC II (loan)	2016	USL	4	0	–		–		–		–		4	0
Toronto FC II (loan)	2017	USL	9	5	–		–		–		–		9	5
Toronto FC II (loan)	2018	USL	10	8	–		–		–		–		10	8
Toronto FC II (loan)	2019	USL League One	1	1	–		–		–		–		1	1
Toronto FC II (loan)	Total		44	17	–		–		–		–		44	17
Columbus Crew SC	2019	MLS	4	0	–		0	0	–		–		4	0
Columbus Crew SC	2020	MLS	2	0	0	0	0	0	–		–		2	0
Columbus Crew SC	Total		6	0	–		0	0	–		–		6	0
Indy Eleven	2021	USL Championship	18	5	–		0	0	–		–		18	5
Sligo Rovers	2022	League of Ireland Premier Division	13	2	–		0	0	–		0	0	13	2
Forge FC	2022	Canadian Premier League	10	1	2	0	0	0	—		0	0	12	1
Forge FC	2023	Canadian Premier League	17	4	2	0	3	0	—		—		22	4
Forge FC	2024	Canadian Premier League	22	1	1	0	5	2	—		2	0	30	3
Forge FC	Total		49	6	5	0	8	2	0	0	2	0	64	8
Career totals			199	46	5	0	18	5	2	0	6	1	230	52

=== International ===
As of October 6, 2016

Canada
Year	Apps	Goals
2014	1	0
2015	0	0
2016	1	0
Total	2	0
