= Patrick McDonald (soccer) =

American soccer player (born 2003)

- McDonald in 2025

Personal information
- Full name: Patrick Finley McDonald
- Date of birth: March 28, 2003 (age 23)
- Place of birth: Greensboro, North Carolina, United States
- Height: 5 ft 10 in (1.78 m)
- Position: Midfielder

Team information
- Current team: St. Louis City 2
- Number: 88

Youth career
- –2020: North Carolina Fusion
- 2021: Indiana Fire

College career
Years	Team	Apps	(Gls)
2021–2024	Indiana Hoosiers	89	(8)

Senior career*
Years	Team	Apps	(Gls)
2020–2021	Indy Eleven	0	(0)
2022	North Carolina Fusion U23	12	(1)
2024	Salem City FC (Note: North Carolina Fusion U23 re-branded to Salem City FC in 2024)	7	(1)
2025	Toronto FC II	22	(2)
2026–	St. Louis City 2	2	(1)
- * Club domestic league appearances and goals as of March 8, 2026

Patrick Finley McDonald (born March 28, 2003) is an American soccer player who was play for MLS Next Pro club St. Louis City 2.

== Early life ==
McDonald played youth soccer with the North Carolina Fusion and Indiana Fire.

== College career ==
In 2021, McDonald began attending the Indiana University Bloomington, where he played for the men's soccer team. On September 26, 2021, he scored his first collegiate goal, in a 1-0 victory over the Michigan State Spartans. Ahead of his junior season in 2023, he was named a Big Ten Conference Player to Watch. At the end of the season, he was named to the All-Big Ten First Team. Despite being drafted in the 2023 MLS SuperDraft, McDonald elected to return to Indiana for his final season of college eligibility. Ahead of his senior season in 2024, he was named to the Big Ten Player to Watch list. At the end of the season, he was named to the All-Big Ten Fist Team and All-North Region First Team.

== Club career ==
In August 2020, McDonald signed an Academy contract with USL Championship club Indy Eleven. In 2021, he re-signed with the club on another academy contract.

In 2022, he played with the North Carolina Fusion U23 in USL League Two.

At the 2024 MLS SuperDraft, McDonald was selected in the third round (59th overall) by Toronto FC. However, rather than to turn professional immediately, he chose to return to college for his senior season in 2024. He subsequently joined Salem City FC (re-branded from North Carolina Fusion U23) in USL League Two for the 2024 season.

In January 2025, he attended pre-season with the Toronto FC first team, impressing the coaches, however, he suffered an injury impeding his progress. In March 2025, he signed a professional contract with their second team, Toronto FC II, in MLS Next Pro. He made his debut on March 28 against New England Revolution II, in a substitute appearance. On April 18, 2025, he started his first match and scored his first goal in a match against Carolina Core FC.

== Career statistics ==
As of January 23, 2026

Club	Season	League			Playoffs		National Cup		Other		Total	
Club	Season	Division	Apps	Goals	Apps	Goals	Apps	Goals	Apps	Goals	Apps	Goals
Indy Eleven	2020	USL Championship	0	0	—		—		—		0	0
Indy Eleven	2021	USL Championship	0	0	—		—		—		0	0
Indy Eleven	Total		0	0	0	0	0	0	0	0	0	0
North Carolina Fusion U23	2022	USL League Two	12	1	4	0	0	0	—		16	1
Salem City FC	2024	USL League Two	7	1	0	0	—		—		7	1
Toronto FC II	2025	MLS Next Pro	22	2	—		—		—		22	2
St. Louis City 2	2026	MLS Next Pro	0	0	—		—		—		0	0
Career total			41	4	4	0	0	0	0	0	45	4
