= Costa Iliadis =

Canadian soccer player (born 2005)

Personal information
- Full name: Constantinos Iliadis
- Date of birth: December 28, 2005 (age 20)
- Place of birth: Toronto, Ontario, Canada
- Height: 1.84 m (6 ft 1/2 in)
- Position: Midfielder

Youth career
- Serbian White Eagles
- Sigma FC
- 2009–2016: Rush Canada SA
- 2016–2021: Panathinaikos
- 2021–2022: Aris Voulas
- 2022: Ilioupolis

College career
Years	Team	Apps	(Gls)
2026–	Clemson Tigers	0	(0)

Senior career*
Years	Team	Apps	(Gls)
2021–2022	Aris Voulas	15	(2)
2023–2024	CF Montréal U23	31	(2)
2024–2025	Toronto FC II	20	(0)
2026–	Sigma FC	13	(4)
- * Club domestic league appearances and goals as of July 11, 2026

Constantinos Iliadis (Greek: Κωνσταντίνος Ηλιάδης; born December 28, 2005) is a Canadian soccer player who plays for Sigma FC in the Ontario Premier League.

== Early life ==
Iliadis began his youth career with the Serbian White Eagles and Sigma FC. He later joined Rush Canada SA (he also briefly played with their Michigan side on a temporary basis). In 2016, he moved to Greece and joined the Panathinaikos Academy.

== College career ==
For 2026, he committed to attend Clemson University to play for the men's soccer team.

== Club career ==
In 2021, at age 16, he joined Aris Voulas in the Greek fourth tier (East Attica Football Clubs Association regional division), winning the Epsana Cup in May 2022. In 2022, he joined the U19 team of Ilioupolis.

In 2023, he began playing with CF Montréal U23 in Ligue1 Québec. He returned to the squad for the 2024 season.

In September 2024, he signed with Toronto FC II in MLS Next Pro. He made his debut on September 22, in a substitute appearance against New York Red Bulls II. After the season, Toronto FC II exercised Iliadis' contract option for 2025.

== Personal life ==
He is the younger brother of fellow professional soccer player Ilias Iliadis.

== Career statistics ==
As of October 5, 2025

Club	Season	League			Playoffs		Domestic Cup		Other		Total	
Club	Season	Division	Apps	Goals	Apps	Goals	Apps	Goals	Apps	Goals	Apps	Goals
Aris Voulas	2021–2022	EPSANA Division	15 (Note: Includes matches in the secondary playoff league group stage)	2	–		–		4 (Note: Appearances in EPSANA Cup)	0	19	2
CF Montréal U23	2023	Ligue1 Québec	18	0	–		–		–		18	0
CF Montréal U23	2024	Ligue1 Québec	13	2	–		–		0	0	13	2
CF Montréal U23	Total		31	2	0	0	0	0	0	0	31	2
Toronto FC II	2024	MLS Next Pro	1	0	–		–		–		1	0
Toronto FC II	2025	MLS Next Pro	19	0	—		–		–		19	0
Toronto FC II	Total		20	0	0	0	0	0	0	0	20	0
Career total			50	2	0	0	0	0	0	0	50	2
