= Canada men's national soccer team results =

For lists of Canada men's national soccer team results see:

- Canada men's national soccer team results (1924–1977)
- Canada men's national soccer team results (1980–1999)
- Canada men's national soccer team results (2000–2019)
- Canada men's national soccer team results (2020–present)
- Canada men's national soccer team results (unofficial matches)
