= Yeferson Contreras =

Colombian footballer (born 1999)

Personal information
- Full name: Yeferson Andrés Contreras Villamizar
- Date of birth: 10 August 1999 (age 27)
- Place of birth: Cúcuta, Colombia
- Height: 1.78 m (5 ft 10 in)
- Position: Forward

Team information
- Current team: Šibenik (on loan from América de Cali)
- Number: 11

Youth career
- –2018: América de Cali

Senior career*
Years	Team	Apps	(Gls)
2018–	América de Cali	2	(0)
2019	→ Orsomarso (loan)	6	(2)
2020	→ Indy Eleven (loan)	1	(0)
2020–	→ Šibenik (loan)	6	(0)
- * Club domestic league appearances and goals as of 17 February 2021

Yeferson Andrés Contreras Villamizar (born 10 August 1999) is a Colombian professional footballer who plays as a forward for Croatian club HNK Šibenik on loan from América de Cali.

== Club career ==
In February 2020, Contreras was loaned to USL Championship club Indy Eleven.
