= Michael Sullivan (soccer, born 2003) =

American soccer player

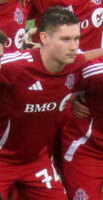
- Sullivan in 2025

Personal information
- Date of birth: March 3, 2003 (age 23)
- Place of birth: Tarentum, Pennsylvania, United States
- Height: 6 ft 0 in (1.83 m)
- Position: Midfielder

Team information
- Current team: FC Cincinnati 2

Youth career
- 2010–2017: Century United FC
- 2017–2021: Arsenal FC of Pittsburgh

College career
Years	Team	Apps	(Gls)
2021–2024	Pittsburgh Panthers	67	(6)

Senior career*
Years	Team	Apps	(Gls)
2021–2024	Steel City FC		
2025	Toronto FC II	24	(4)
2025	→ Toronto FC (loan)	1	(0)
2026–	FC Cincinnati 2	3	(0)
- * Club domestic league appearances and goals as of March 19, 2026

Michael Sullivan (born March 3, 2003) is an American soccer player who plays for FC Cincinnati 2 in MLS Next Pro.

== Early life ==
Sullivan played youth soccer with Arsenal FC of Pittsburgh and Century United FC. He also helped lead Deer Lakes High School to multiple PIAA 2A boys championship appearances.

== College career ==
In 2020, Sullivan committed to attend the University of Pittsburgh to play for the men's soccer team. He scored his first collegiate goal on October 5, 2021 against the Cleveland State Vikings. On November 2, 2022, he scored a brace in a 5-1 victory over the NC State Wolfpack. He was named to the ACC All-Academic Team in his sophomore and junior seasons. In his senior season, he played a variety of positions, including center back, right back, defensive midfielder, central midfielder and attacking midfielder. Over his four seasons, he recorded six goals and two assists in 67 appearances.

== Club career ==
In 2021, Sullivan joined Steel City FC in the National Premier Soccer League. He helped the side win the NPSL Great Lakes Division title in both 2022 and 2023. He also played for the team in 2024.

At the 2025 MLS SuperDraft, Sullivan was selected in the second round (39th overall) by Toronto FC. In March 2025, he signed a contract with their second team, Toronto FC II, in MLS Next Pro. He made his professional debut on March 9 against FC Cincinnati 2. On March 22, 2025, he joined the first team on a short-term loan. He scored his first goal for Toronto FC II on April 10, 2025, in a 1-0 victory over Inter Miami CF II. In May and June 2025, he signed additional short term loans with the first team. On June 28, 2025, he made his Major League Soccer debut, in a substitute appearance against the Portland Timbers.

In December 2025, he signed with FC Cincinnati 2 in MLS Next Pro for the 2026 season.
