= Joe Schiraldi =

Canadian soccer player (born 1951)

Personal information
- Full name: Giuseppe Schiraldi
- Date of birth: 1 December 1951 (age 74)
- Place of birth: Sannicandro di Bari, Italy
- Height: 1.75 m (5 ft 9 in)
- Position: Midfielder

Senior career*
Years	Team	Apps	(Gls)
1971	Toronto City		
1972	Hamilton Italo-Canadians		
1973–1974	Toronto Metros	12	(0)
1975–1978	Hamilton Italo-Canadians		

International career
1971–1973	Canada U23	9	(1)
1972–1973	Canada	7	(0)
- * Club domestic league appearances and goals

Giuseppe Schiraldi (born 1 December 1951) is a Canadian former soccer player who played as a midfielder. He made seven appearances for the Canada national team.

== Club career ==
Schiraldi played with Toronto City in 1971. In 1972, he played in the National Soccer League with Hamilton Italo-Canadians. The following season he played in the North American Soccer League with the Toronto Metros for two seasons. He returned to play in the National Soccer League in 1975 with Hamilton Italo-Canadians. He also played at the college level with the University of Akron in 1971.

== International career ==
Schiraldi made his debut for the Canada men's national under-23 soccer team on May 30, 1971 against Bermuda. He also represented Canada in the 1971 Pan American Games. He made his debut for the senior team on August 20, 1972 against the United States in a FIFA World Cup qualifier match and later featured in seven matches.

== Managerial career ==
Since retiring, Schiraldi has been active as a youth soccer coach and camp instructor in Ontario. In July 2006, he was appointed York Region Soccer Association Regional U12 Player Development Coach. He became a teacher at Brother Edmund rice catholic secondary school in Toronto for many years and then moved to Don Bosco secondary catholic school, where he taught Physical education. He used to teach at Bryst Academy as the U12 coach. He now is the coach of the SSE90 boys U14 team (2019)
