= Paul Lee (soccer) =

Canadian soccer player

Personal information
- Date of birth: 16 April 1961 (age 65)
- Place of birth: Manchester, England
- Position: Defender

International career
Years	Team	Apps	(Gls)
1983	Canada	1	(0)

Paul Lee (born 16 April 1961) is a Canadian former international soccer player who played as a defender.
