= Bill Young (soccer) =

Canadian soccer player

Personal information
- Full name: William George Young
- Date of birth: 27 July 1950 (age 76)
- Place of birth: Vancouver, British Columbia, Canada
- Height: 1.73 m (5 ft 8 in)
- Position: Midfielder

International career
Years	Team	Apps	(Gls)
1972	Canada	4	(0)

William George Young (born 27 July 1950) is a Canadian former international soccer player.
