= Dominik Rešetar =

Croatian footballer

Personal information
- Full name: Dominik Rešetar
- Date of birth: 27 May 2000 (age 26)
- Place of birth: Zabok, Croatia
- Height: 1.83 m (6 ft 0 in)
- Position: Forward

Team information
- Current team: Orijent
- Number: 11

Youth career
- –2017: Inter Zaprešić
- 2018–: Dinamo Zagreb

Senior career*
Years	Team	Apps	(Gls)
2017–2018	Inter Zaprešić	9	(1)
2018–2021	Dinamo Zagreb II	13	(0)
2020–2021	→ Sporting Kansas City II (loan)	24	(2)
2021–2022	Inter Zaprešić	23	(9)
2022-2025	Rudeš	62	(9)
2025-	Orijent	31	(3)

International career^{‡}
2018	Croatia U18	2	(0)
2018–2019	Croatia U19	10	(3)
- * Club domestic league appearances and goals as of 17 June 2026 ‡ National team caps and goals as of February 28, 2019

Dominik Rešetar (born 27 May 2000) is a Croatian footballer who plays as a striker for Orijent.

== Club career ==
Rešetar made his professional debut at the age of 17 while playing for NK Inter Zaprešić in the Croatian First Football League1. earning a start against HNK Cibalia on Sept. 23, 2017. He went on to make nine appearances for Zapresic in the 2017–18 season, scoring his first professional goal in a 3–3 draw with NK Slaven Belupo on April 19, 2018.

Rešetar moved to GNK Dinamo Zagreb Academy and played for GNK Dinamo Zagreb II ahead of the 2018–19 campaign, making six appearances in the Croatian Second Football League and one in the UEFA Youth League for Dinamo's Under-19 squad. In the 2019–20 season, Rešetar played in seven games for Dinamo Zagreb II, tallying the game-winning assist against NK Kustošija on Oct. 20, 2019.

On January 22, 2020, Resetar joined teammate Petar Čuić as they both sent on loan to USL Championship side Sporting Kansas City II ahead of their 2020 campaign.

== International career ==
On the international stage, Rešetar has made 10 appearances for Croatia's Under-19 team, scoring three goals – two against India on Sept. 4, 2018 and another against Slovenia four days later in a set of friendly matches. His most recent Under-19 cap came in a friendly against Serbia on Feb. 12, 2019.
