= Peter-Lee Vassell =

Jamaican footballer (born 1998)

Personal information
- Full name: Peter-Lee Vassell
- Date of birth: 3 February 1998 (age 28)
- Place of birth: St. James, Jamaica
- Position: Midfielder

Team information
- Current team: Birmingham Legion
- Number: 16

Youth career
- Cornwall College, Jamaica

Senior career*
Years	Team	Apps	(Gls)
2016–2017	Montego Bay United	0	(0)
2017–2019	Harbour View	44	(3)
2019	Los Angeles FC	6	(0)
2019	→ Phoenix Rising (loan)	6	(0)
2021	Indy Eleven	20	(3)
2022	Hartford Athletic	16	(1)
2025	Montego Bay United	3	(1)
2025–	Birmingham Legion	7	(1)

International career^{‡}
2018–	Jamaica	16	(5)
- * Club domestic league appearances and goals as of 13:18, 26 October 2025 (UTC) ‡ National team caps and goals as of 22:53, 14 March 2021 (UTC)

Peter-Lee Vassell (born 3 February 1998) is a Jamaican professional footballer who plays as a midfielder for the Jamaica national team and Birmingham Legion.

== Early life and education ==
Vassell grew up in St. James parish in Jamaica in a footballing family. He attended Howard Cooke Primary School and Cornwall College.

== Career ==
=== Club ===
Vassell began his career at Faulkland FC in Montego Bay in the Western Super League, before spending some time in the RSPL with Montego Bay United. He moved to Harbour View ahead of the 2017-18 RSPL season.

In January 2019, Vassell was drafted and signed by Los Angeles FC.

In August 2019, Vassell was loaned to USL Championship side Phoenix Rising FC.

In April 2021, Vassell joined Indy Eleven in the USL Championship ahead of the 2021 season. Following the 2021 season, it was announced that Vassell's contract option was declined by Indy Eleven.

In January 2022, Vassell joined Hartford Athletic in the USL Championship ahead of the 2022 season.

In March 2025, Vassell returned to Montego Bay United.

Vassell returned to the United States on 4 September 2025, signing with USL Championship side Birmingham Legion.

=== International ===
Vassell has been capped at under-17, under-20, under-23 and senior team levels for Jamaica.

== Career statistics ==
=== Club ===
As of 25 January 2019.

Club	Season	League			Cup		Continental		Other		Total	
Club	Season	Division	Apps	Goals	Apps	Goals	Apps	Goals	Apps	Goals	Apps	Goals
Harbour View	2017–18	National Premier League	30	2	0	0	0	0	0	0	30	2
Harbour View	2018–19	National Premier League	14	1	0	0	0	0	0	0	14	1
Total			44	3	0	0	0	0	0	0	44	3

=== International ===
As of match played 25 January 2019.

National team	Year	Apps	Goals
Jamaica	2018	9	5
Jamaica	2019	7	1
Jamaica	2020	0	0
Jamaica	2021	1	0
Total		17	6

=== International goals ===
Scores and results list Jamaica's goal tally first.

No	Date	Venue	Opponent	Score	Result	Competition
1.	29 April 2018	Sir Vivian Richards Stadium, North Sound, Antigua and Barbuda	Antigua and Barbuda	1–0	2–0	Friendly
2.	17 August 2018	Kirani James Athletic Stadium, Saint George's, Grenada	Grenada	2–0	5–1	Friendly
3.	17 August 2018	Kirani James Athletic Stadium, Saint George's, Grenada	Grenada	3–0	5–1	Friendly
4.	20 August 2018	Wildey Turf, Bridgetown, Barbados	Barbados	2–2	2–2	Friendly
5.	14 October 2018	Ergilio Hato Stadium, Willemstad, Curaçao	Bonaire	5–0	6–0	2019–20 CONCACAF Nations League qualification
6.	6 September 2019	Montego Bay Sports Complex, Montego Bay, Jamaica	Antigua and Barbuda	6–0	6–0	2019–20 CONCACAF Nations League B
