= Petar Čuić =

Croatian footballer

Personal information
- Full name: Petar Čuić
- Date of birth: 2 June 1999 (age 27)
- Place of birth: Zagreb, Croatia
- Height: 1.86 m (6 ft 1 in)
- Positions: Defender; midfielder

Team information
- Current team: Tigar Sveta Nedelja
- Number: 21

Youth career
- –2015: NK Zagreb
- 2015–2021: Dinamo Zagreb

Senior career*
Years	Team	Apps	(Gls)
2018–2021	Dinamo Zagreb II	31	(1)
2020–2021	→ Sporting Kansas City II (loan)	45	(2)
2022	FC Tulsa	23	(0)
2023	Septemvri Sofia	14	(0)
2023	Rogaška	7	(0)
2024	Fužinar	12	(2)
2024	Rudeš	5	(0)
2025–	Tigar Sveta Nedelja	0	(0)

International career^{‡}
2016–	Croatia U19		
- * Club domestic league appearances and goals as of 13 February 2025 ‡ National team caps and goals as of February 28, 2019

Petar Čuić (born 2 June 1999) is a Croatian footballer who plays as a defender for Tigar Sveta Nedelja.

== Club career ==
Čuić joined the GNK Dinamo Zagreb Academy in 2015 and rose through the ranks from the club's Under-15 squad to the reserve team by the start of 2018. Čuić made his debut in the Croatian Second Football League with GNK Dinamo Zagreb II in April 2018, making two appearances in the latter stages of the club's 2017-18 campaign. Čuić became a regular in the Dinamo Zagreb II lineup in the second half of the 2018–19 season, making 15 appearances before playing in a further 14 games in the opening period of the 2019–20 season – tallying his first league goal against NK Međimurje on Sept. 21, 2019.

Earlier in the year, Čuić helped Dinamo Zagreb's U-23 side advance to the Premier League International Cup final by beating Southampton F.C. 3–1 in the semifinal, with Čuić coming off the bench to tally the final goal of the game. During the club's Under-19 UEFA Youth League appearance in 2016, Čuić started in one game, helping his side claim a 1–0 victory on the road against Italian giants Juventus FC on Dec. 7, 2016.

On January 22, 2020, the Croatian signed, alongside teammate Dominik Rešetar, joined USL Championship side Sporting Kansas City II on loan ahead of the 2020 season. Following the 2021 season, Kansas City opted to declined their purchase option on Čuić.

Čuić joined USL Championship side FC Tulsa in January 2022 ahead of their upcoming season.

== International career ==
Internationally, Čuić has represented Croatia's Under-16 and Under-19 National Teams, making his debut for the U-19s in a friendly against Italy on Nov. 8, 2016.
