= Darwin Matheus =

Venezuelan footballer (born 2001)

Personal information
- Full name: Darwin Daniel Matheus Tovar
- Date of birth: 9 April 2001 (age 25)
- Place of birth: Barinas, Venezuela
- Height: 5 ft 5 in (1.65 m)
- Position: Forward

Team information
- Current team: Estudiantes de Mérida

Youth career
- Zamora

Senior career*
| Years | Team | Apps | (Gls) |
| 2018–2021 | Zamora | 50 | (11) |
| 2021–2022 | Atlanta United 2 | 59 | (9) |
| 2023–2024 | Istra 1961 | 24 | (3) |
| 2024 | Birmingham Legion | 6 | (1) |
| 2025 | Zamora | 5 | (0) |
| 2025 | Fidelis Andria | 8 | (0) |
| 2026- | Estudiantes de Mérida | 5 | (0) |
- * Club domestic league appearances and goals as of 21 December 2025

Darwin Daniel Matheus Tovar (born 9 April 2001) is a Venezuelan professional footballer who plays as a forward for Estudiantes de Mérida.

== Club career ==
Born in Barinas, Matheus began his career with Primera División side Zamora. He made his professional debut for the club on 2 September 2018 against Zulia in the league. He came on as a 66th minute substitute for Enderson Abreu as Zamora won 2–1. On 24 September, Matheus scored his first professional goal against Deportivo Anzoátegui. His 54th minute goal was the only one for Zamora in a 1–2 defeat. Despite just appearing in nine matches during the 2018 season, Matheus still earned his first title when Zamora won the Primera División that season.

On 1 April 2021, Matheus was announced as a member of Atlanta United 2.

On 14 December 2022, Matheus signed a contract with Croatian side Istra 1961.

== Career statistics ==
=== Club ===
As of match played 10 December 2020

Appearances and goals by club, season and competition
| Club | Season | League | | | Cup | | Continental | | Total | |
| Club | Season | Division | Apps | Goals | Apps | Goals | Apps | Goals | Apps | Goals |
|---|---|---|---|---|---|---|---|---|---|---|
| Zamora | 2018 | Venezuelan Primera División | 9 | 2 | 2 | 0 | — | — | 11 | 2 |
| Zamora | 2019 | Venezuelan Primera División | 22 | 4 | 8 | 2 | 0 | 0 | 24 | 6 |
| Zamora | 2020 | Venezuelan Primera División | 19 | 5 | 0 | 0 | 2 | 0 | 21 | 5 |
| Zamora | Total | | 50 | 11 | 10 | 2 | 2 | 0 | 62 | 13 |
| Career total | | | 50 | 11 | 10 | 2 | 2 | 0 | 62 | 13 |

== Honours ==
Zamora team

- Venezuelan Primera División: 2018
