= Matías Benítez (footballer) =

Argentine footballer

Personal information
- Full name: Fernando Matías Benítez
- Date of birth: 13 November 2000 (age 25)
- Place of birth: Rosario, Argentina
- Height: 5 ft 7 in (1.70 m)
- Position: Forward

Team information
- Current team: Deportivo Morón

Youth career
- –2015: Academía Renato Cesarini
- 2015–2021: River Plate

Senior career*
Years	Team	Apps	(Gls)
2021–2022	River Plate	0	(0)
2021	→ Atlanta United 2 (loan)	22	(2)
2022	→ San Martín SJ (loan)	7	(0)
2023–2024	Racing Club	15	(0)
2024	Arsenal Sarandí	15	(0)
2024–2025	Central Córdoba SdE	16	(1)
2025–2026	Coronel Aguirre		
2026–	Deportivo Morón	6	(0)
- * Club domestic league appearances and goals as of 17:41, 27 April 2026 (UTC)

Fernando Matías Benítez (born 13 November 2000) is an Argentine professional footballer who plays as a forward for Deportivo Morón.

== Career ==
=== River Plate ===
In 2015, Benítez joined River Plate from the Renato Cesarini academy. He signed a professional contract with River Plate in February 2021 after scoring 5 goals in 20 appearances for the club's reserve team over the previous two seasons.

==== Loan to Atlanta United 2 ====
On 2 April 2021, Benítez signed on loan with USL Championship side Atlanta United 2, who play in the second-tier of the US soccer pyramid. He made his professional debut on 16 May 2021, starting and scoring for Atlanta against OKC Energy in a 2–2 draw.

== Honours ==
Central Córdoba (SdE)

- Copa Argentina: 2024
