= Connor Stanley (footballer) =

English footballer (born 2001)

Personal information
- Full name: Connor Scott Stanley
- Date of birth: 30 December 2001 (age 24)
- Place of birth: Redditch, England
- Position: Winger

Team information
- Current team: Worcester City

Youth career
- 2014–2018: Birmingham City
- 2018–2021: Manchester United

Senior career*
Years	Team	Apps	(Gls)
2021–2022	Manchester United	0	(0)
2021	→ Atlanta United 2 (loan)	27	(1)
2022–2023	Bolton Wanderers	0	(0)
2022	→ Bamber Bridge (loan)	5	(2)
2022	→ United of Manchester (loan)	3	(0)
2023	→ Bamber Bridge (loan)	14	(1)
2023	Hereford	11	(1)
2023–2024	Stourbridge	7	(0)
2024	Alvechurch	3	(0)
2024–2025	Banbury United	26	(4)
2025	Kettering Town	17	(0)
2025–	Worcester City	21	(1)
- * Club domestic league appearances and goals as of 14:35, 28 April 2026 (UTC)

Connor Scott Stanley (born 30 December 2001) is an English footballer who plays as a winger for Southern League Premier Division Central club Worcester City.

== Career ==
=== Manchester United ===
Stanley joined the Manchester United academy in August 2018 from Birmingham City. In February 2020 he was included in United's Europa League squad.

On 2 April 2021, Stanley signed on loan with USL Championship side Atlanta United 2, who play in the second-tier of the US soccer pyramid. He made his professional debut on 16 May 2021, starting for Atlanta against OKC Energy. His loan expired and was not renewed by Atlanta following their 2021 season.

=== Bolton Wanderers ===
On 17 June 2022, it was announced Stanley would join Bolton Wanderers once his Manchester United contract expired and would join Bolton's B team. On 18 October 2022, Stanley joined Northern Premier League Premier Division club Bamber Bridge on a one-month loan deal. He scored in his first two appearances, a 1–0 win against Hyde United and a 2–1 win against Gainsborough Trinity. After the completion of his loan, he went out on loan again — this time to United of Manchester for a month. He played three times. On 4 February 2023, he re-joined Bamber Bridge on another one month's loan. On 25 May 2023, he was announced as one of five B Team releases.

=== Hereford ===
On 31 July 2023, Stanley signed for National League North club Hereford on a short-term deal, after a successful trial period in which he featured in a number of the club's pre-season friendlies. He made his debut on the left wing in the opening league fixture of the season. He scored his first goal for the club in their first home fixture of the season, the only goal in a 1–0 win. He left the club at the end of his short term contract in December 2023.

=== Stourbridge ===
On 22 December 2023, Southern League Premier Division club Stourbridge announced the signing of Stanley.

=== Banbury United ===
In November 2024, Stanley joined Banbury United.

=== Kettering Town ===
On 20 June 2025, Stanley joined Southern League Premier Division Central side Kettering Town.

=== Worcester City ===
On 5 December 2025, Stanley moved to Kettering's league rivals Worcester City.

== Career statistics ==
As of match played 12 August 2025

Appearances and goals by club, season and competition
Club	Season	League			FA Cup		League Cup		Other		Total	
Club	Season	Division	Apps	Goals	Apps	Goals	Apps	Goals	Apps	Goals	Apps	Goals
Manchester United	2020–21	Premier League	0	0	0	0	0	0	5 (Note: Appearance(s) in EFL Trophy for U21 team)	0	5	0
Manchester United	2021–22	Premier League	0	0	0	0	0	0	0	0	0	0
Manchester United	Total		0	0	0	0	0	0	5	0	5	0
Atlanta United 2 (loan)	2021	USL Championship	27	1	—		—		0	0	27	1
Bolton Wanderers	2022–23	League One	0	0	0	0	0	0	0	0	0	0
Bamber Bridge (loan)	2022–23	NPL Premier Division	5	2	0	0	—		0	0	5	2
FC United of Manchester (loan)	2022–23	NPL Premier Division	3	0	0	0	—		0	0	3	0
Bamber Bridge (loan)	2022–23	NPL Premier Division	14	1	0	0	—		0	0	14	1
Hereford	2023–24	National League North	11	1	4	0	—		1 (Note: Appearance(s) in FA Trophy)	0	16	1
Stourbridge	2023–24	SL Premier Division Central	7	0	—		—		—		7	0
Alvechurch	2024–25	SL Premier Division Central	3	0	0	0	—		0	0	3	0
Banbury United	2024–25	SL Premier Division Central	26	4	0	0	—		0	0	26	4
Kettering Town	2025–26	SL Premier Division Central	17	0	2	0	—		3 (Note: One appearance in FA Trophy; two appearances in Northamptonshire Senior Cup)	0	22	0
Worcester City	2025–26	SL Premier Division Central	0	0	0	0	—		0	0	0	0
Career total			113	9	6	0	0	0	9	0	128	9
