= 2024 Atlanta United FC season =

Atlanta United FC
2024 season
- Owner: Arthur Blank
- President: Garth Lagerwey
- Head coach: Rob Valentino (interim)
- Stadium: Mercedes-Benz Stadium; Atlanta, Georgia
- MLS: Conference: 9th Overall: 20th
- MLS Cup Playoffs: Conference Semifinals
- U.S. Open Cup: Quarter-finals
- Leagues Cup: Group stage
- Top goalscorer: League: Saba Lobzhanidze (9); All: Saba Lobzhanidze (11)
- Average home league attendance: 46,831
Home colors	Away colors

The 2024 Atlanta United FC season was the eighth season of Atlanta United FC's existence, and the sixteenth year that a professional soccer club from Atlanta, Georgia will compete in the top division of American soccer. Atlanta United played their home games at Mercedes-Benz Stadium. Outside of MLS, they competed in the 2024 U.S. Open Cup and the 2024 Leagues Cup.

On June 3, Atlanta United parted ways with head coach Gonzalo Pineda, after starting the season winning just 4 of their first 16 league matches, with the club standing in 13th place in the Eastern Conference. It was also announced that Rob Valentino would immediately step in as the interim head coach until a new one is hired.

== Club ==
Squad no.	Player	Nationality	Position(s)	Date of birth (age)	Previous club	Apps	Goals
Goalkeepers
1	Brad Guzan (captain)	(United States)	GK	September 9, 1984 (age 42)	(England) Middlesbrough	234	0
22	Josh Cohen	(United States)	GK	August 8, 1992 (age 34)	(Israel) Maccabi Haifa	8	0
31	Quentin Westberg	(United States)	GK	April 25, 1986 (age 40)	(Canada) Toronto FC	6	0
Defenders
2	Ronald Hernández	(Venezuela)	RB	September 21, 1997 (age 29)	(Scotland) Aberdeen	63	2
3	Derrick Williams	(Republic of Ireland)	CB	January 17, 1993 (age 33)	(United States) D.C. United	33	1
4	Luis Abram	(Peru)	CB	February 22, 1996 (age 30)	(Spain) Granada	55	0
5	Stian Rode Gregersen (DP)	(Norway)	CB	May 17, 1995 (age 31)	(France) Bordeaux	32	3
11	Brooks Lennon	(United States)	RB	September 22, 1997 (age 29)	(United States) Real Salt Lake	167	10
18	Pedro Amador	(Portugal)	LB	December 18, 1998 (age 27)	(Portugal) Moreirense	16	0
21	Efrain Morales (HGP)	(Bolivia)	CB	March 4, 2004 (age 22)	(United States) Atlanta United Academy	7	0
24	Noah Cobb (HGP)	(United States)	CB	July 20, 2005 (age 21)	(United States) Atlanta United 2	27	0
47	Matthew Edwards (HGP)	(United States)	LB	February 16, 2003 (age 23)	(United States) Atlanta United 2	5	0
Midfielders
6	Bartosz Slisz (DP)	(Poland)	DM	March 29, 1999 (age 27)	(Poland) Legia Warsaw	37	2
8	Tristan Muyumba	(France)	DM	March 7, 1997 (age 29)	(France) Guingamp	51	1
9	Saba Lobzhanidze	(Georgia (country))	LW	December 18, 1994 (age 31)	(Turkey) Hatayspor	50	14
13	Dax McCarty	(United States)	CM	April 30, 1987 (age 39)	(United States) Nashville SC	32	0
16	Xande Silva	(Portugal)	LW	March 16, 1997 (age 29)	(France) Dijon	43	7
20	Edwin Mosquera	(Colombia)	LW	June 27, 2001 (age 25)	(Colombia) Independiente Medellín	53	5
23	Adyn Torres (HGP)	(United States)	LW	November 13, 2007 (age 18)	(United States) Atlanta United 2	2	0
25	Luke Brennan (HGP)	(United States)	LW	February 24, 2005 (age 21)	(United States) Atlanta United 2	11	0
28	Tyler Wolff (HGP)	(United States)	RW	February 13, 2003 (age 23)	(United States) Atlanta United Academy	57	6
30	Nicolas Firmino	(Brazil)	AM	January 30, 2001 (age 25)	(United States) Atlanta United 2	14	4
35	Ajani Fortune (HGP)	(Trinidad and Tobago)	AM	December 30, 2002 (age 23)	(United States) Atlanta United 2	54	1
59	Aleksei Miranchuk (DP)	(Russia)	AM	October 17, 1995 (age 30)	(Italy) Atalanta	14	3
Forwards
19	Daniel Ríos	(Mexico)	CF	February 22, 1995 (age 31)	(Mexico) Guadalajara	37	10
29	Jamal Thiaré	(Senegal)	CF	March 31, 1993 (age 33)	(France) Le Havre	40	8

== Player movement ==
=== In ===
No.	Pos.	Player	Transferred from	Type	US	Fee/notes	Date	Source
—	MF	(Argentina) Esequiel Barco	(Argentina) River Plate	Loan return	Non-US	Free	January 1, 2024	
—	MF	(Argentina) Franco Ibarra	(Canada) Toronto FC	Loan return	Non-US	Free	January 1, 2024	
14	DF	(United States) Aiden McFadden	(United States) Memphis 901	Loan return	US	Free	January 1, 2024	
25	MF	(United States) Luke Brennan	(United States) Atlanta United 2	Transfer	US	Homegrown Contract	January 1, 2024	
30	MF	(Brazil) Nicolas Firmino	(United States) Atlanta United 2	Transfer	US	Free	January 1, 2024	
23	MF	(United States) Adyn Torres	(United States) Atlanta United 2	Transfer	US	Homegrown Contract	January 1, 2024	
16	MF	(Portugal) Xande Silva	(France) Dijon	Transfer	Non-US	Undisclosed	January 1, 2024	
22	GK	(United States) Josh Cohen	(Israel) Maccabi Haifa	Transfer	US	Free	January 1, 2024	
—	DF	(United States) Garrison Tubbs	(United States) Wake Forest University	Transfer	US	Homegrown Contract	January 1, 2024	
13	MF	(United States) Dax McCarty	(United States) Nashville SC	Transfer	US	Free	January 9, 2024	
5	DF	(Norway) Stian Rode Gregersen	(France) Bordeaux	Transfer	Non-US	$2,000,000	January 11, 2024	
3	DF	(Republic of Ireland) Derrick Williams	(United States) D.C. United	Transfer	US	Re-Entry Draft	January 12, 2024	
6	MF	(Poland) Bartosz Slisz	(Poland) Legia Warsaw	Transfer	Non-US	$3,500,000	January 17, 2024	
47	DF	(United States) Matthew Edwards	(United States) Atlanta United 2	Transfer	US	Homegrown Contract	June 21, 2024	
18	DF	(Portugal) Pedro Amador	(Portugal) Moreirense	Transfer	Non-US	Free	July 1, 2024	
59	MF	(Russia) Aleksei Miranchuk	(Italy) Atalanta	Transfer	Non-US	$13,000,000	July 30, 2024	

=== Out ===
No.	Pos.	Player	Transferred to	Type	US	Fee/notes	Date	Source
16	MF	(Portugal) Xande Silva	(France) Dijon	Loan return	Non-US	Free	January 1, 2024	
22	DF	(Mexico) Juanjo Purata	(Mexico) Tigres UANL	Loan return	Non-US	Free	January 1, 2024	
30	MF	(South Sudan) Machop Chol	(United States) San Antonio FC	Option Declined	US	Free	January 1, 2024	
36	FW	(United States) Jackson Conway	(United States) Charleston Battery	Option Declined	US	Free	January 1, 2024	
25	GK	(Senegal) Clément Diop	Free Agent	Option Declined	US	Free	January 1, 2024	
—	GK	(United States) Justin Garces	Free Agent	Option Declined	US	Free	January 1, 2024	
6	MF	(Cuba) Osvaldo Alonso	Retired	Out of Contract	US	Free	January 1, 2024	
19	FW	(Spain) Miguel Berry	(United States) LA Galaxy	Out of Contract	US	Free	January 1, 2024	
20	FW	(Brazil) Matheus Rossetto	(Brazil) Fortaleza	Out of Contract	US	Free	January 1, 2024	
13	MF	(United States) Amar Sejdić	(United States) Nashville SC	Out of Contract	US	Free	January 1, 2024	
—	MF	(Argentina) Esequiel Barco	(Argentina) River Plate	Transfer	Non-US	$6,400,000	January 1, 2024	
—	DF	(United States) Garrison Tubbs	(United States) D.C. United	Transfer	US	$125,000 GAM	January 1, 2024	
12	DF	(United States) Miles Robinson	(United States) FC Cincinnati	Transfer	US	Free	January 3, 2024	
18	MF	(Haiti) Derrick Etienne	(Canada) Toronto FC	Transfer	US	$200,000 GAM	April 24, 2024	
7	FW	(Greece) Giorgos Giakoumakis	(Mexico) Cruz Azul	Transfer	Non-US	$10,000,000	June 16, 2024	
10	MF	(Argentina) Thiago Almada	(Brazil) Botafogo	Transfer	Non-US	$30,000,000	July 6, 2024	
14	MF	(United States) Aiden McFadden	(United States) Louisville City	Transfer	US	Undisclosed	July 19, 2024	
26	DF	(United States) Caleb Wiley	(England) Chelsea	Transfer	US	$11,000,000	July 22, 2024	

==== Loan in ====
No.	Pos.	Player	Loaned From	US	Start	End	Source
19	FW	(Mexico) Daniel Ríos	(Mexico) Guadalajara	US	March 20, 2024	End of Season	

==== Loan out ====
No.	Pos.	Player	Loaned to	Start	End	Source
—	MF	(Argentina) Franco Ibarra	(Argentina) Rosario Central	January 6, 2024	December 31, 2024	
5	MF	(Argentina) Santiago Sosa	(Argentina) Racing Club	January 19, 2024	December 31, 2024	
14	DF	(United States) Aiden McFadden	(United States) Louisville City	April 5, 2024	July 19, 2024	

==== SuperDraft picks ====
2024 Atlanta United SuperDraft Picks
Round	Selection	Player	Position	College	Status
1	19	(Jamaica) Jayden Hibbert	GK	UConn	US
2	48	(Spain) Javier Armas	MF	Oregon State	Non-US
3	77	(Denmark) Casper Mols	GK	Kentucky	Non-US

== Competitions ==
Win Draw Loss

=== Non-competitive ===
==== Pre-season exhibitions ====
January 27, 2024	Birmingham Legion	1–2	Atlanta United FC	Birmingham, AL
3:00 PM EST	Martinez 42'	Report	Giakoumakis 20'; Firmino 22'	Stadium: Protective Stadium; Attendance: 7,577

February 3, 2024	Atlanta United FC	1–1	Memphis 901	Athens, GA
3:00 PM EST	Thiaré 87'	Report	Pickering 2'	Stadium: Turner Soccer Complex

February 7, 2024	Atlanta United FC	2–1	CF Montréal	St. Petersburg, FL
	Thiaré 34'; Wolff 66'	Report	Yankov 100'	Stadium: Al Lang Stadium
Note: Match was played in two 60 minute halves

February 10, 2024	Tampa Bay Rowdies	0–2	Atlanta United FC	St. Petersburg, FL
		Report	Firmino 53'; Thiaré 64'	Stadium: Al Lang Stadium

February 17, 2024	Atlanta United FC	1–3	Sporting Kansas City	Miami Shores, FL
11:00 AM EST	Firmino 20'	Report	Agada 73' (pen.), 83' (pen.); Vargas 85'	Stadium: Barry University

=== MLS ===
==== Standings ====
===== Eastern Conference =====
MLS Eastern Conference table (2024)
Pos	Team	Pld	W	L	T	GF	GA	GD	Pts	Qualification
7	New York Red Bulls	34	11	9	14	55	50	+5	47	Qualification for round one and the 2025 Leagues Cup
8	CF Montréal	34	11	13	10	48	64	−16	43	Qualification for the wild-card round and the 2025 Leagues Cup
9	Atlanta United FC	34	10	14	10	46	49	−3	40	Qualification for the wild-card round and the 2025 Leagues Cup
10	D.C. United	34	10	14	10	52	70	−18	40	
11	Toronto FC	34	11	19	4	40	61	−21	37	

Source: MLS
Rules for classification: 1) points; 2) total wins; 3) total goal differential; 4) total goals scored; 5) fewer disciplinary points; 6) away goal differential; 7) away goals scored; 8) home goals differential; 9) home goals scored; 10) coin toss (2 clubs tied) or drawing of lots (≥3 clubs tied)

===== Overall =====
Overall MLS standings table
Pos	Team	Pld	W	L	T	GF	GA	GD	Pts	Qualification
18	Austin FC	34	11	14	9	39	48	−9	42	Qualification for the U.S. Open Cup Round of 32 (Note: As one of the U.S. teams who did not qualify for the 2025 CONCACAF Champions Cup or the 2025 Leagues Cup)
19	FC Dallas	34	11	15	8	54	56	−2	41	Qualification for the U.S. Open Cup Round of 32
20	Atlanta United FC	34	10	14	10	46	49	−3	40	
21	D.C. United	34	10	14	10	52	70	−18	40	Qualification for the U.S. Open Cup Round of 32
22	Toronto FC	34	11	19	4	40	61	−21	37	

Source: MLS
Rules for classification: 1) points; 2) total wins; 3) total goal differential; 4) total goals scored; 5) fewer disciplinary points; 6) away goal differential; 7) away goals scored; 8) home goals differential; 9) home goals scored; 10) coin toss (2 clubs tied) or drawing of lots (≥3 clubs tied)

==== Matches ====
February 24 1	Columbus Crew	1–0	Atlanta United FC	Columbus, OH
2:00 PM	Hernández 27'	Report	Giakoumakis (yellow card) 21'; Gregersen (yellow card) 53'	Stadium: Lower.com Field; Attendance: 20,406; Referee: Rafael Bonilla

March 9 2	Atlanta United FC	4–1	New England Revolution	Atlanta, GA
7:30 PM	Almada 45+2' (pen.); Giakoumakis 55' (pen.), 60', 74'	Report	Polster (yellow card) 45+1'; C. Gil 83'	Stadium: Mercedes-Benz Stadium; Attendance: 67,727; Referee: Rafael Santos

March 17 3	Atlanta United FC	2–0	Orlando City SC	Atlanta, GA
7:00 PM	Lobjanidze 9'; Wiley (yellow card) 23'; Muyumba (yellow card) 45+1'; Silva (yellow card) 51'; Giakoumakis 71'; Guzan (yellow card) 73'; Almada (yellow card) 90+6'	Report	Jansson (yellow card) 49'	Stadium: Mercedes-Benz Stadium; Attendance: 42,631; Referee: Cristian Campo Hernandez

March 23 4	Toronto FC	2–0	Atlanta United FC	Toronto, ON
7:30 PM	Long (yellow card) 30'; Spicer 35'; Owusu 71'	Report		Stadium: BMO Field; Attendance: 25,768; Referee: Scott Bowman

March 31 5	Atlanta United FC	3–0	Chicago Fire FC	Atlanta, GA
3:30 PM	Giakoumakis 45'; Wiley (yellow card) 50'; Thiaré 65', 90+5'; Lennon (yellow card) 90'	Report	Herbers (yellow card) 65'; Terán (red card) 84'	Stadium: Mercedes-Benz Stadium; Attendance: 42,525; Referee: Lukasz Szpala

April 6 6	New York City FC	1–1	Atlanta United FC	New York, NY
7:30 PM	Sands (yellow card) 15'; Rodríguez 43'; Gray (yellow card) 50'; Parks (yellow card) 74'	Report	Williams (yellow card) 61'; Thiaré 65'	Stadium: Citi Field; Attendance: 21,497; Referee: Rosendo Mendoza

April 14 7	Atlanta United FC	2–2	Philadelphia Union	Atlanta, GA
2:30 PM	Almada (yellow card) 25'; Ríos 55'; Wiley 63'; Muyumba (yellow card) 84'	Report	Carranza (yellow card) 21'; Martínez (yellow card) 35'; Gazdag (yellow card) 35'; Uhre 73'; Wagner (yellow card) 75', (goal) 77'; McGlynn (yellow card) 90+5'; Bedoya (yellow card) 91'	Stadium: Mercedes-Benz Stadium; Attendance: 42,763; Referee: Jon Freemon

April 20 8	Atlanta United FC	1–2	FC Cincinnati	Atlanta, GA
7:30 PM	Almada 59'; Fortune (yellow card) 68'	Report	Orellano 62'; Acosta 64', (yellow card) 90+3'; Robinson (yellow card) 83'; Bucha (yellow card) 89'	Stadium: Mercedes-Benz Stadium; Attendance: 42,600; Referee: Armando Villarreal

April 27 9	Chicago Fire FC	0–0	Atlanta United FC	Chicago, IL
8:30 PM	Arigoni (yellow card) 75'	Report	Lennon (yellow card) 46'; Slisz (yellow card) 89'; Mosquera (yellow card) 90+7'	Stadium: Soldier Field; Attendance: 18,236; Referee: Filip Dujic

May 4 10	Atlanta United FC	1–2	Minnesota United FC	Atlanta, GA
7:30 PM	Abram (yellow card) 20'; Lobzhanidze 82'	Report	Arriaga 54' (yellow card) 90+8'; Oluwaseyi 60'	Stadium: Mercedes-Benz Stadium; Attendance: 43,338; Referee: Guido Gonzales, Jr.

May 11 11	Atlanta United FC	2–3	D.C. United	Atlanta, GA
7:30 PM	Almada 16', (yellow card) 45+2'; Slisz (yellow card) 30'; Peltola 48' (o.g.); Giakoumakis (yellow card) 70'; Abram (yellow card) 75'	Report	Benteke 19', 44', 55'; Dájome (yellow card) 38'; Antley (yellow card) 84'	Stadium: Mercedes-Benz Stadium; Attendance: 42,822; Referee: Joe Dickerson

May 15 12	FC Cincinnati	1–0	Atlanta United FC	Cincinnati, OH
7:30 PM	Kelsy 7'	Report	Slisz (yellow card) 23'; Giakoumakis (yellow card) 74'	Stadium: TQL Stadium; Attendance: 24,593; Referee: Ted Unkel

May 18 13	Nashville SC	1–1	Atlanta United FC	Nashville, TN
1:30 PM	Mukhtar 40' (pen.); Surridge (yellow card) 45+3'; Bauer (yellow card) 90'	Report	Guzan (yellow card) 37'; Gregersen (yellow card) 44'; Slisz 55'	Stadium: Geodis Park; Attendance: 28,377; Referee: Drew Fischer

May 25 14	Atlanta United FC	0–1	Los Angeles FC	Atlanta, GA
7:30 PM	Lennon (yellow card) 26'; Guzan (red card) 60'; Mosquera (yellow card) 77'	Report	Atuesta (yellow card) 10' (yellow-red card) 81'; Bogusz 63'	Stadium: Mercedes-Benz Stadium; Attendance: 43,128; Referee: Sergii Boiko

May 29 15	Inter Miami CF	1–3	Atlanta United FC	Fort Lauderdale, FL
7:30 PM	Avilés (yellow card) 57'; Messi 62'	Report	Lobzhanidze 44', 59'; Thiaré 73'	Stadium: Chase Stadium; Attendance: 21,326; Referee: Armando Villarreal

June 2 16	Atlanta United FC	2–3	Charlotte FC	Atlanta, GA
4:30 PM	Almada 35', (yellow card) 36'; Lennon (yellow card) 51'; Silva 76'; Muyumba (yellow card) 90+3'	Report	Williams 40' (o.g.); Urso (yellow card) 50'; Abada 56', 68'; Bronico (yellow card) 83'; Uronen (yellow card) 87'; Kahlina (yellow card) 89'	Stadium: Mercedes-Benz Stadium; Attendance: 61,209; Referee: Ismir Pekmic

June 15 17	Atlanta United FC	2–2	Houston Dynamo FC	Atlanta, GA
7:30 PM	Silva (yellow card) 8', (goal) 55'; Ríos 25'	Report	Escobar 5', (yellow card) 42'; Carrasquilla (yellow card) 44'; Aliyu (yellow card) 53'; Micael (yellow card) 58'; Blessing 89'	Stadium: Mercedes-Benz Stadium; Attendance: 42,630; Referee: Victor Rivas

June 19 18	D.C. United	0–1	Atlanta United FC	Washington, D.C.
7:30 PM	Tubbs (yellow card) 34'; Klich (yellow card) 45+1'	Report	Almada (yellow card) 18', (goal) 79' Cobb (yellow card) 63'	Stadium: Audi Field; Attendance: 15,899; Referee: Pierre-Luc Lauziere

June 22 19	St. Louis City SC	1–1	Atlanta United FC	St. Louis, MO
8:30 PM	Vassilev 50', (yellow card) 85'; Reid (yellow card) 58'	Report	Gregersen (yellow card) 46'; Ríos 71'	Stadium: CityPark; Referee: Filip Dujic

June 29 20	Atlanta United FC	2–1	Toronto FC	Atlanta, GA
7:30 PM	Almada 45+2'; Fortune (yellow card) 48'; Gregersen (yellow card) 72'; Thiaré 90+7'	Report	Bernardeschi 46'; Long (yellow card) 52'	Stadium: Mercedes-Benz Stadium; Attendance: 42,568; Referee: Marcos DeOliveira II

July 3 21	New England Revolution	2–1	Atlanta United FC	Foxborough, MA
7:30 PM	Vrioni 11', 45'	Report	Gregersen (yellow card) 37'; Ríos 90+1'	Stadium: Gillette Stadium; Attendance: 20,171; Referee: Jair Marrufo

July 6 22	Real Salt Lake	5–2	Atlanta United FC	Sandy, UT
9:30 PM	Crooks 1'; Luna (yellow card) 57', (goal) 84'; Ojeda 59'; Arango 68'; Katranis 78'	Report	Lobzhanidze 31'; Williams (yellow card) 67'; Ríos 80'; Fortune (yellow card) 89'	Stadium: America First Field; Attendance: 20,396; Referee: Rubiel Vazquez

July 13 23	CF Montréal	1–0	Atlanta United FC	Montreal, QC
7:30 PM	Ruan 51'; Edwards (yellow card) 53'; Martínez (yellow card) 88'; Saliba (yellow card) 90+4'	Report	Gregersen (yellow card) 38' (yellow-red card) 55'	Stadium: Saputo Stadium; Attendance: 19,619; Referee: Ted Unkel

July 17 24	Atlanta United FC	2–2	New York City FC	Atlanta, GA
7:30 PM	Ríos 1'; Lobjanidze 38'; Muyumba (yellow card) 61'; Lennon (yellow card) 86'	Report	Bakrar 65'; Haak (yellow card) 77'; Talles Magno 82'	Stadium: Mercedes-Benz Stadium; Attendance: 42,524; Referee: Lukasz Szpala

July 20 25	Atlanta United FC	2–1	Columbus Crew	Atlanta, GA
7:30 PM	Muyumba (yellow card) 25'; Gregersen 60', 77'; Guzan (yellow card) 90+7'	Report	Cheberko (yellow card) 29'; Rossi 36'	Stadium: Mercedes-Benz Stadium; Attendance: 42,601; Referee: Rosendo Mendoza

August 24 26	LA Galaxy	2–0	Atlanta United FC	Carson, CA
10:30 PM	Paintsil (yellow card) 46'; Puig (yellow card) 71', (goal) 76'; Reus 84'	Report	Fortune (yellow card) 65'	Stadium: Dignity Health Sports Park; Attendance: 25,174; Referee: Rubiel Vazquez

August 31 27	Charlotte FC	0–1	Atlanta United FC	Charlotte, NC
7:30 PM		Report	Gregersen (yellow card) 42'; Fortune 76'	Stadium: Bank of America Stadium; Referee: Alexis Da Silva

September 14 28	Atlanta United FC	0–2	Nashville SC	Atlanta, GA
7:30 PM	Williams (yellow card) 55'	Report	Muyl 5'; Surridge (yellow card) 45+4'; Mukhtar (yellow card) 56', (goal) 76'	Stadium: Mercedes-Benz Stadium; Attendance: 43,330; Referee: Armando Villarreal

September 18 29	Atlanta United FC	2–2	Inter Miami CF	Atlanta, GA
7:30 PM	McCarty (yellow card) 19'; Lobzhanidze 56'; Miranchuk 84'	Report	Weigandt (yellow card) 10'; Ruiz 29'; Campana 59', (yellow card) 78'	Stadium: Mercedes-Benz Stadium; Attendance: 67,795; Referee: Rosendo Mendoza

September 21 30	New York Red Bulls	2–2	Atlanta United FC	Harrison, NJ
7:30 PM	Vanzeir 31'; Carballo (yellow card) 45+2'; Coronel (yellow card) 72'; Nealis (yellow card) 87'; Manoel 90+7'	Report	Miranchuk 45+3' (pen.); Lobjanidze (yellow card) 68'; Mosquera 90+2'	Stadium: Red Bull Arena; Attendance: 19,751; Referee: Chris Penso

September 28 31	Philadelphia Union	1–1	Atlanta United FC	Chester, PA
7:30 PM	Harriel 61', (yellow card) 76'; Uhre (yellow card) 69'	Report	Lennon (yellow card) 52'; Lobjanidze 72'	Stadium: Subaru Park; Attendance: 18,837; Referee: Fotis Bazakos

October 2 32	Atlanta United FC	1–2	CF Montréal	Atlanta, GA
7:30 PM	Ríos 45+3'; Lennon (yellow card) 55'	Report	Duke (yellow card) 39'; Martínez 43', 76'; Saliba (yellow card) 82'	Stadium: Mercedes-Benz Stadium; Attendance: 42,501; Referee: Ted Unkel

October 5 33	Atlanta United FC	2–1	New York Red Bulls	Atlanta, GA
7:30 PM	Gregersen (yellow card) 70'; Miranchuk 75' (pen.); Wolff 90+7'	Report	Tolkin (yellow card) 32'; D. Nealis (red card) 66'; Forsberg (yellow card) 69'; Coronel (yellow card) 70'; S. Nealis (yellow card) 70'; Eile (yellow card) 90'; Ngoma 90+14'	Stadium: Mercedes-Benz Stadium; Attendance: 43,428; Referee: Ismir Pekmic

October 19 34	Orlando City SC	1–2	Atlanta United FC	Orlando, FL
6:00 PM	Ojeda 42', (yellow card) 62'	Report	Lobjanidze 7'; Thiaré 16'	Stadium: Inter&Co Stadium; Attendance: 25,046; Referee: Rubiel Vazquez

=== MLS Cup Playoffs ===
==== Wild Card ====
October 22 Wild Card	CF Montréal	2–2 (4–5 p)	Atlanta United FC	Montreal, QC
7:30 PM EDT	Martínez 63', 89' (pen.); Campbell (yellow card) 90+3'	Report	Lennon 29'; Gregersen 44'; McCarty (yellow card) 82'	Stadium: Saputo Stadium; Attendance: 16,566; Referee: Joe Dickerson
	Penalties
	Martínez (penalty scored); Pearce (penalty missed); Saliba (penalty scored); Corbo (penalty scored); Vilsaint (penalty scored)		(penalty scored) McCarty; (penalty scored) Ríos; (penalty scored) Miranchuk; (penalty scored) Williams; (penalty scored) Lobzhanidze

==== Round one ====
October 25 Match 1	Inter Miami CF	2–1	Atlanta United FC	Fort Lauderdale, FL
8:30 PM EDT	Suárez 2'; Alba 60'	Report	Lobzhanidze 39'; Williams (yellow card) 90+4'	Stadium: Chase Stadium; Attendance: 20,673; Referee: Allen Chapman

November 2 Match 2	Atlanta United FC	2–1	Inter Miami CF	Atlanta, GA
7:00 PM EDT	Hernández (yellow card) 45+1'; Williams 58', (yellow card) 64'; Slisz (yellow card) 90+3'; Silva 90+4', (yellow card) 90+5'	Report	Martínez 40'; Avilés (yellow card) 56'	Stadium: Mercedes-Benz Stadium; Attendance: 68,455; Referee: Rubiel Vazquez

November 9 Match 3	Inter Miami CF	2–3	Atlanta United FC	Fort Lauderdale, FL
8:00 PM EDT	Rojas 17'; Redondo (yellow card) 35'; Messi 65'; Busquets (yellow card) 80'	Report	Thiaré 19', 21'; Slisz 76'; Amador (yellow card) 88'	Stadium: Chase Stadium; Attendance: 20,673; Referee: Lukasz Szpala

==== Conference semifinals ====
November 24 Conference semifinals	Orlando City SC	1–0	Atlanta United FC	Orlando, FL
3:30 PM EDT	Enrique 39'	Report	Williams (yellow card) 59'	Stadium: Inter&Co Stadium; Attendance: 25,055; Referee: Armando Villarreal

==== U.S. Open Cup ====
Atlanta United entered the tournament in the Round of 32.

May 7 Round of 32	Atlanta United FC (Georgia (U.S. state))	3–0	(North Carolina) Charlotte Independence	Kennesaw, GA
7:30 PM	McCarty (yellow card) 5'; Edwards (yellow card) 35'; Firmino 52', 71'; Ríos 85'	Report	Ngah (yellow card) 26'; Álvarez (yellow card) 76'	Stadium: Fifth Third Bank Stadium; Attendance: 2,522; Referee: Lorenzo Hernandez

May 21 Round of 16	Charleston Battery (South Carolina)	0–0 (4–5 p)	(Georgia (U.S. state)) Atlanta United FC	Mount Pleasant, SC
7:00 PM	Segbers (yellow card) 74'	Report	Brennan (yellow card) 20'; Slisz (yellow card) 77'; Carleton (yellow card) 100'; Mosquera (yellow card) 102'	Stadium: Patriots Point Soccer Complex; Attendance: 5,000; Referee: Fabio Tovar
	Penalties
	Rodríguez (penalty scored); Conway (penalty scored); Myers (penalty scored); Smith (penalty scored); Gutierrez (penalty missed); Molloy (penalty missed)		(penalty missed) Lennon; (penalty scored) Ríos; (penalty scored) Slisz; (penalty scored) Hernández; (penalty scored) Firmino; (penalty scored) Gregersen

July 9 Quarterfinals	Atlanta United FC (Georgia (U.S. state))	1–2	(Indiana) Indy Eleven	Kennesaw, GA
7:00 PM	Wiley (yellow card) 48'; Firmino 90+1'	Report	Williams 31'; Martínez (yellow card) 52'; McCarty 83' (o.g.)	Stadium: Fifth Third Bank Stadium; Referee: Sergii Demianchuk

=== Leagues Cup ===
==== East 7 ====
Pos	Team	Pld	W	PW	PL	L	GF	GA	GD	Pts	Qualification
1	(United States Soccer Federation) D.C. United	2	1	1	0	0	6	3	+3	5	Advance to knockout stage
2	(Mexican Football Federation) Santos Laguna	2	0	1	0	1	0	3	−3	2	Advance to knockout stage
3	(United States Soccer Federation) Atlanta United FC	2	0	0	2	0	3	3	0	2	

Source: Leagues Cup
Rules for classification: Tiebreakers

July 26 Group stage	Atlanta United FC (United States)	3–3 (5–6 p)	(United States) D.C. United	Atlanta, GA
8:00 PM	Ríos 20', 81' (pen.); Lobzhanidze 38'	Report	Benteke 4'; Stroud 25', 32'; McVey (yellow card) 56'; Santos (yellow card) 86'	Stadium: Mercedes-Benz Stadium; Referee: Fernando Guerrero
	Penalties
	McCarty (penalty scored); Lennon (penalty missed); Firmino (penalty scored); Lobzhanidze (penalty scored); Thiaré (penalty scored); Williams (penalty scored); Slisz (penalty missed)		Klich (penalty missed); Benteke (penalty scored); Herrera (penalty scored); Dájome (penalty scored); Santos (penalty scored); McVey (penalty scored); Pirani (penalty scored)

August 4 Group stage	Atlanta United FC (United States)	0–0 (3–5 p)	(Mexico) Santos Laguna	Atlanta, GA
4:00 PM	Lennon (yellow card) 11'; Muyumba (yellow card) 54'; Silva (yellow card) 60'	Report	Carrillo (yellow card) 54'; Lozano (yellow card) 60'; Núñez (yellow card) 61'; Amione (yellow card) 90+6'	Stadium: Mercedes-Benz Stadium; Attendance: 29,118; Referee: Iván Barton
	Penalties
	Lobzhanidze (penalty scored); McCarty (penalty scored); Firmino (penalty scored); Thiaré (penalty missed)		Muñoz (penalty scored); Lozano (penalty scored); Núñez (penalty scored); Fagúndez (penalty scored); Macías (penalty scored)

== Statistics ==
=== Top scorers ===
As of December 10, 2024

Place	Position	Name	MLS	Playoffs	U.S. Open Cup	Leagues Cup	Total
1	MF	(Georgia (country)) Saba Lobzhanidze	9	1	0	1	11
2	FW	(Mexico) Daniel Ríos	7	0	1	2	10
3	FW	(Senegal) Jamal Thiaré	6	2	0	0	8
4	MF	(Argentina) Thiago Almada (Note: transferred to Botafogo during the season)	6	0	0	0	6
5	FW	(Greece) Giorgos Giakoumakis (Note: transferred to Cruz Azul during the season)	5	0	0	0	5
6	MF	(Brazil) Nicolas Firmino	0	0	3	0	3
6	DF	(Norway) Stian Gregersen	2	1	0	0	3
6	MF	(Russia) Aleksei Miranchuk	3	0	0	0	3
6	MF	(Portugal) Xande Silva	2	1	0	0	3
10	MF	(Poland) Bartosz Slisz	1	1	0	0	2
11	MF	(Trinidad and Tobago) Ajani Fortune	1	0	0	0	1
11	DF	(United States) Brooks Lennon	0	1	0	0	1
11	MF	(Colombia) Edwin Mosquera	1	0	0	0	1
11	DF	(United States) Caleb Wiley (Note: transferred to Chelsea during the season)	1	0	0	0	1
11	DF	(Republic of Ireland) Derrick Williams	0	1	0	0	1
11	MF	(United States) Tyler Wolff	1	0	0	0	1
Own Goals			1	0	0	0	1
Total			46	8	4	3	61

=== Appearances and goals ===
As of 10 December 2024

No.	Pos	Player	Nat	MLS			Open Cup			Leagues Cup			Playoffs			Total		
No.	Pos	Player	Nat	App	St	G	App	St	G	App	St	G	App	St	G	App	St	G
Goalkeepers
1	GK	Brad Guzan	(United States)	32	32	0	0	0	0	0	0	0	5	5	0	37	37	0
22	GK	Josh Cohen	(United States)	3	2	0	3	3	0	2	2	0	0	0	0	8	7	0
Defenders
2	DF	Ronald Hernández	(Venezuela)	13	7	0	3	3	0	1	1	0	4	3	0	21	14	0
3	DF	Derrick Williams	(Republic of Ireland)	27	26	0	0	0	0	1	1	0	5	5	1	33	32	1
4	DF	Luis Abram	(Peru)	19	11	0	2	2	0	1	1	0	5	3	0	27	17	0
5	DF	Stian Rode Gregersen	(Norway)	23	20	2	3	2	0	2	2	0	4	3	1	32	27	3
11	DF	Brooks Lennon	(United States)	33	33	0	2	0	0	2	2	0	2	2	1	39	37	1
18	DF	Pedro Amador	(Portugal)	9	9	0	0	0	0	2	1	0	5	5	0	16	15	0
21	DF	Efrain Morales	(Bolivia)	4	3	0	3	3	0	0	0	0	0	0	0	7	6	0
24	DF	Noah Cobb	(United States)	19	16	0	2	0	0	0	0	0	2	0	0	23	16	0
26	DF	Caleb Wiley	(United States)	21	21	1	2	1	0	0	0	0	0	0	0	23	22	1
47	DF	Matthew Edwards	(United States)	1	0	0	3	2	0	1	0	0	0	0	0	5	2	0
Midfielders
6	MF	Bartosz Slisz	(Poland)	28	27	1	2	0	0	1	1	0	5	5	1	36	33	2
8	MF	Tristan Muyumba	(France)	30	25	0	1	1	0	2	2	0	4	1	0	37	29	0
9	MF	Saba Lobzhanidze	(Georgia (country))	30	29	9	1	1	0	2	2	1	5	5	1	38	37	11
10	MF	Thiago Almada	(Argentina)	17	16	6	0	0	0	0	0	0	0	0	0	17	16	6
13	MF	Dax McCarty	(United States)	22	10	0	3	2	0	2	0	0	5	4	0	32	16	0
16	MF	Xande Silva	(Portugal)	23	17	2	1	0	0	2	2	0	4	0	1	30	19	3
18	MF	Derrick Etienne Jr. (Note: transferred to Toronto FC during the season)	(Haiti)	2	0	0	0	0	0	0	0	0	0	0	0	2	0	0
20	MF	Edwin Mosquera	(Colombia)	22	5	1	1	1	0	1	0	0	0	0	0	24	6	1
23	MF	Adyn Torres	(United States)	0	0	0	2	0	0	0	0	0	0	0	0	2	0	0
25	MF	Luke Brennan	(United States)	7	0	0	3	2	0	0	0	0	0	0	0	10	2	0
28	MF	Tyler Wolff	(United States)	18	6	1	1	1	0	0	0	0	1	0	0	20	7	1
30	MF	Nicolas Firmino	(Brazil)	8	2	0	3	3	3	2	0	0	0	0	0	13	5	3
35	MF	Ajani Fortune	(Trinidad and Tobago)	27	13	1	2	2	0	2	2	0	5	4	0	36	21	1
41	MF	Alan Carleton (Note: signed on short-term loan from Atlanta United 2)	(United States)	0	0	0	1	0	0	0	0	0	0	0	0	1	0	0
59	MF	Aleksei Miranchuk	(Russia)	9	8	3	0	0	0	0	0	0	5	5	0	14	13	3
62	MF	Ashton Gordon	(Jamaica)	0	0	0	2	2	0	0	0	0	0	0	0	2	2	0
Forwards
7	FW	Giorgos Giakoumakis	(Greece)	11	8	5	0	0	0	0	0	0	0	0	0	11	8	5
19	FW	Daniel Ríos	(Mexico)	27	16	7	3	1	1	2	2	2	5	0	0	37	19	10
29	FW	Jamal Thiaré	(Senegal)	25	12	6	1	1	0	2	0	0	5	5	2	33	18	8
Total				25		35	3		4	1		3	0		0	29		42
