= 2023 Atlanta United FC season =

Atlanta United FC
2023 season
- Owner: Arthur Blank
- President: Garth Lagerwey
- Head coach: Gonzalo Pineda
- Stadium: Mercedes-Benz Stadium; Atlanta, Georgia
- MLS: Conference: 6th Overall: 10th
- MLS Cup Playoffs: Round One
- U.S. Open Cup: Third Round
- Leagues Cup: Group Stage
- Top goalscorer: League: Giorgos Giakoumakis (17); All: Giorgos Giakoumakis (19)
- Average home league attendance: 47,526
Home colors	Away colors	Third colors

The 2023 Atlanta United FC season was the seventh season of Atlanta United FC's existence, and the fifteenth year that a professional soccer club from Atlanta, Georgia competed in the top division of American soccer. Atlanta United play their home games at Mercedes-Benz Stadium. Outside of MLS, they competed in the 2023 U.S. Open Cup and also participated in the 2023 Leagues Cup for the first time.

== Club ==
Squad no.	Player	Nationality	Position(s)	Date of birth (age)	Previous club	Apps	Goals
Goalkeepers
1	Brad Guzan (captain)	(United States)	GK	September 9, 1984 (age 42)	(England) Middlesbrough	197	0
25	Clément Diop	(Senegal)	GK	October 13, 1993 (age 32)	(United States) New England Revolution	3	0
31	Quentin Westberg	(United States)	GK	April 25, 1986 (age 40)	(Canada) Toronto FC	6	0
Defenders
2	Ronald Hernández	(Venezuela)	RB	September 21, 1997 (age 29)	(Scotland) Aberdeen	42	2
4	Luis Abram	(Peru)	CB	February 22, 1996 (age 30)	(Spain) Granada	28	0
11	Brooks Lennon	(United States)	RB	September 22, 1997 (age 29)	(United States) Real Salt Lake	128	9
12	Miles Robinson (GA)	(United States)	CB	March 14, 1997 (age 29)	(United States) Syracuse University	150	4
22	Juanjo Purata	(Mexico)	CB	January 9, 1998 (age 28)	(Mexico) UANL	49	7
24	Noah Cobb (HGP)	(United States)	CB	July 20, 2005 (age 21)	(United States) Atlanta United 2	4	0
26	Caleb Wiley (HGP)	(United States)	LB	December 22, 2004 (age 21)	(United States) Atlanta United Academy	62	5
Midfielders
5	Santiago Sosa	(Argentina)	DM	May 3, 1999 (age 27)	(Argentina) River Plate	70	2
6	Osvaldo Alonso	(Cuba)	DM	November 11, 1985 (age 40)	(United States) Minnesota United FC	13	0
8	Tristan Muyumba	(France)	DM	March 7, 1997 (age 29)	(France) Guingamp	14	1
9	Saba Lobzhanidze (DP)	(Georgia (country))	LW	December 18, 1994 (age 31)	(Turkey) Hatayspor	12	3
10	Thiago Almada (DP)	(Argentina)	AM	April 26, 2001 (age 25)	(Argentina) Vélez Sarsfield	66	20
13	Amar Sejdić	(United States)	DM	November 29, 1996 (age 29)	(Canada) CF Montréal	60	0
16	Xande Silva	(Portugal)	RW	March 16, 1997 (age 29)	(France) Dijon	13	4
18	Derrick Etienne	(Haiti)	LW	November 25, 1996 (age 29)	(United States) Columbus Crew	25	0
20	Matheus Rossetto	(Brazil)	AM	June 3, 1996 (age 30)	(Brazil) Athletico Paranaense	98	1
21	Edwin Mosquera	(Colombia)	LW	June 27, 2001 (age 25)	(Colombia) Independiente Medellín	29	4
28	Tyler Wolff (HGP)	(United States)	RW	February 13, 2003 (age 23)	(United States) Atlanta United Academy	41	6
30	Machop Chol (HGP)	(South Sudan)	RW	November 14, 1998 (age 27)	(United States) Wake Forest University	35	2
35	Ajani Fortune (HGP)	(Trinidad and Tobago)	AM	December 30, 2002 (age 23)	(United States) Atlanta United 2	18	0
51	Nicolas Firmino	(Brazil)	AM	January 30, 2001 (age 25)	(United States) Atlanta United 2	1	1
52	Luke Brennan (HGP)	(United States)	LW	February 24, 2005 (age 21)	(United States) Atlanta United 2	1	0
Forwards
7	Giorgos Giakoumakis (DP)	(Greece)	CF	December 9, 1994 (age 31)	(Scotland) Celtic	32	19
19	Miguel Berry	(Spain)	CF	September 16, 1997 (age 29)	(United States) D.C. United	30	1
29	Jamal Thiaré	(Senegal)	CF	March 31, 1993 (age 33)	(France) Le Havre	7	0

== Player movement ==
=== In ===
No.	Pos.	Player	Transferred from	Type	US	Fee/notes	Date	Source
18	MF	(Haiti) Derrick Etienne	(United States) Columbus Crew	Transfer	US	Free	November 30, 2022	
31	GK	(United States) Quentin Westberg	(Canada) Toronto FC	Transfer	US	Free	December 23, 2022	
32	FW	(Paraguay) Erik López	(Argentina) Banfield	Loan return	US	Free	January 1, 2023	
24	DF	(United States) Noah Cobb	(United States) Atlanta United 2	Transfer	US	Homegrown Contract	January 1, 2023	
35	MF	(Trinidad and Tobago) Ajani Fortune	(United States) Atlanta United 2	Transfer	US	Homegrown Contract	January 1, 2023	
28	MF	(United States) Tyler Wolff	(Belgium) Beveren	Loan return	US	Free	January 4, 2023	
25	GK	(Senegal) Clément Diop	(United States) New England Revolution	Transfer	US	Free	January 11, 2023	
4	DF	(Peru) Luis Abram	(Spain) Granada	Transfer	Non-US	$300,000	February 2, 2023	
7	FW	(Greece) Giorgos Giakoumakis	(Scotland) Celtic	Transfer	Non-US	$5,200,000	February 8, 2023	
19	FW	(Spain) Miguel Berry	(United States) D.C. United	Transfer	US	$250,000 GAM	February 21, 2023	
8	MF	(France) Tristan Muyumba	(France) Guingamp	Transfer	Non-US	$1,000,000	July 6, 2023	
29	FW	(Senegal) Jamal Thiaré	(France) Le Havre	Transfer	Non-US	Free	August 1, 2023	
9	MF	(Georgia (country)) Saba Lobzhanidze	(Turkey) Hatayspor	Transfer	Non-US	$1,500,000	August 2, 2023	

=== Out ===
No.	Pos.	Player	Transferred to	Type	US	Fee/notes	Date	Source
32	DF	(United States) George Campbell	(Canada) CF Montréal	Transfer	US	$900,000 GAM	December 13, 2022	
29	FW	(Mexico) Ronaldo Cisneros	(Mexico) Guadalajara	Loan return	Non-US	Free	January 1, 2023	
34	GK	(Argentina) Rocco Ríos Novo	(Argentina) Lanús	Loan return	US	Free	January 1, 2023	
3	DF	(United States) Alex DeJohn	Retired	Out of Contract	US	Free	January 1, 2023	
23	GK	(Mexico) Raúl Gudiño	(Mexico) Necaxa	Option Declined	Non-US	Free	January 1, 2023	
24	GK	(United States) Dylan Castanheira	Free agent	Option Declined	US	Free	January 1, 2023	
27	DF	(United States) Bryce Washington	(United States) Loudoun United	Option Declined	US	Free	January 1, 2023	
33	DF	(United States) Mikey Ambrose	Retired	Out of Contract	US	Free	January 1, 2023	
20	MF	(United States) Emerson Hyndman	(United States) Memphis 901	Released	US	Free	January 3, 2023	
6	DF	(Argentina) Alan Franco	(Brazil) São Paulo	Transfer	Non-US	$2,300,000	January 5, 2023	
4	FW	(United States) Dom Dwyer	(United States) Oakland Roots	Waived	US	Free	January 6, 2023	
7	FW	(Venezuela) Josef Martínez	(United States) Inter Miami CF	Contract Buyout	US	Free	January 18, 2023	
—	MF	(Argentina) Marcelino Moreno	(Brazil) Coritiba	Transfer	Non-US	$1,500,000	June 20, 2023	
10	MF	(Brazil) Luiz Araújo	(Brazil) Flamengo	Transfer	Non-US	$10,000,000	July 1, 2023	
15	DF	(United States) Andrew Gutman	(United States) Colorado Rapids	Trade	US	$400,000 GAM + IRS	July 5, 2023	
32	FW	(Paraguay) Erik López	(Paraguay) Olimpia	Released	Non-US	Free	August 5, 2023	

==== Loan in ====
No.	Pos.	Player	Loaned From	US	Start	End	Source
22	DF	(Mexico) Juanjo Purata	(Mexico) UANL	Non-US	November 14, 2022	End of Season	
16	MF	(Portugal) Xande Silva	(France) Dijon	Non-US	August 2, 2023	End of Season	

==== Loan out ====
No.	Pos.	Player	Loaned to	Start	End	Source
—	MF	(Argentina) Esequiel Barco	(Argentina) River Plate	January 30, 2022	January 1, 2024	
10	MF	(Argentina) Marcelino Moreno	(Brazil) Coritiba	January 10, 2023	June 20, 2023	
21	MF	(Colombia) Edwin Mosquera	(Argentina) Defensa y Justicia	February 2, 2023	June 9, 2023	
36	FW	(United States) Jackson Conway	(United States) Phoenix Rising	March 17, 2023	June 9, 2023	
14	MF	(Argentina) Franco Ibarra	(Canada) Toronto FC	July 10, 2023	December 31, 2023	
37	DF	(United States) Aiden McFadden	(United States) Memphis 901	August 7, 2023	December 31, 2023	

==== SuperDraft picks ====
Draft picks are not automatically signed to the team roster.

Atlanta traded the 7th overall pick to Real Salt Lake for $175,000 GAM

2023 Atlanta United SuperDraft Picks
Round	Selection	Player	Position	College	Status
2	36	Tyler Young	MF	Campbell	US

== Competitions ==
Win Draw Loss

=== Non-competitive ===
==== Pre-season exhibitions ====
November 16, 2022	Atlanta United	0–1	Aberdeen	Marietta
3:00 PM EST			Clarkson 67'	Stadium: Children's Healthcare of Atlanta Training Ground
Note: United was represented by the academy and Atlanta United 2, its reserve team that competes in the third division MLS Next Pro.

January 28, 2023	Chattanooga FC	3–3	Atlanta United	Chattanooga
3:00 PM EST	Naglestad 7', 28'; McGrath 44'	Report	Luiz Araújo 12' (pen.), 42'; Chol 20'	Stadium: Finley Stadium; Attendance: 7,513

February 4, 2023	Atlante	4–1	Atlanta United	Mexico City
8:00PM	Lajud 15'; García 66'; Velázquez 83' (pen.); Galván 114'		Rossetto 33'	Stadium: Estadio Ciudad de los Deportes
Note: Game was played in four 30 minute quarters.

February 8, 2023	Cruz Azul	3–3	Atlanta United	Mexico City
11:00 AM	Rivero 44'; Cobb 48' (o.g.); Silva 78'		Almada 23'; Luiz Araújo 51', 56'	Stadium: Estadio Azteca; Attendance: 0
Note: Match was played behind closed doors.

February 15, 2023	Atlanta United	3–4	Toluca	Atlanta
7:30 PM EST	Lennon 15'; Luiz Araújo 17'; Brennan 52'	Report	López 19'; Saucedo 45+3'; M. Araújo 62'; Sanvezzo 80'	Stadium: Mercedes-Benz Stadium
Note: 2023 American Family Insurance Cup

February 18, 2023	St. Louis City SC	1–2	Atlanta United	St. Louis
1:00 PM	Klauss 28'	Report	Luiz Araújo 10'; Almada 43' (pen.)	Stadium: Citypark; Attendance: 0
Note: Match was played behind closed doors.

=== MLS ===
==== Standings ====
===== Eastern Conference =====
MLS Eastern Conference table (2023)
Pos	Team	Pld	W	L	T	GF	GA	GD	Pts	Qualification
4	Philadelphia Union	34	15	9	10	57	41	+16	55	Qualification for round one
5	New England Revolution	34	15	9	10	58	46	+12	55	Qualification for round one
6	Atlanta United FC	34	13	9	12	66	53	+13	51	Qualification for round one
7	Nashville SC	34	13	11	10	39	32	+7	49	Qualification for round one
8	New York Red Bulls	34	11	13	10	36	39	−3	43	Qualification for the wild-card round

Source: MLS
Rules for classification: 1) points; 2) total wins; 3) total goal differential; 4) total goals scored; 5) fewer disciplinary points; 6) away goal differential; 7) away goals scored; 8) home goals differential; 9) home goals scored; 10) coin toss (2 clubs tied) or drawing of lots (≥3 clubs tied)

===== Overall =====
Overall MLS standings table
Pos	Team	Pld	W	L	T	GF	GA	GD	Pts	Qualification
8	Los Angeles FC	34	14	10	10	54	39	+15	52	Qualification for the U.S. Open Cup Round of 32 (Note: As one of the top seven teams in the overall table to not qualify for the 2024 CONCACAF Champions Cup)
9	Houston Dynamo FC (U)	34	14	11	9	51	38	+13	51	Qualification for the CONCACAF Champions Cup Round One and U.S. Open Cup Round of 32 (Note: Qualify for both the Champions Cup and U.S. Open Cup as 2023 U.S. Open Cup champions)
10	Atlanta United FC	34	13	9	12	66	53	+13	51	Qualification for the U.S. Open Cup Round of 32
11	Real Salt Lake	34	14	12	8	48	50	−2	50	Qualification for the U.S. Open Cup Round of 32
12	Nashville SC	34	13	11	10	39	32	+7	49	Qualification for the CONCACAF Champions Cup Round One (Note: As 2023 Leagues Cup runner-up)

Source: MLS
Rules for classification: 1) points; 2) total wins; 3) total goal differential; 4) total goals scored; 5) fewer disciplinary points; 6) away goal differential; 7) away goals scored; 8) home goals differential; 9) home goals scored; 10) coin toss (2 clubs tied) or drawing of lots (≥3 clubs tied)
(U) U.S. Open Cup winner

==== Matches ====
February 25 1	Atlanta United FC	2–1	San Jose Earthquakes	Atlanta, GA
7:30 PM	Almada 90+3', 90+9'	Report	Ebobisse 12'	Stadium: Mercedes-Benz Stadium; Attendance: 67,538; Referee: Jon Freemon

March 4 2	Atlanta United FC	1–1	Toronto FC	Atlanta, GA
7:30 PM	Rossetto 60'	Report	Bernardeschi 52'	Stadium: Mercedes-Benz Stadium; Attendance: 42,817; Referee: Nima Saghafi

March 11 3	Charlotte FC	0–3	Atlanta United FC	Charlotte, NC
12:00 PM		Report	Wiley 5', 45+2'; Luiz Araújo 12'	Stadium: Bank of America Stadium; Attendance: 31,538; Referee: Ismail Elfath

March 18 4	Atlanta United FC	5–1	Portland Timbers	Atlanta, GA
7:30 PM	Wiley 25'; Almada 45+5', 86'; Giakoumakis 59'; Luiz Araújo 75'	Report	Ikoba 83'	Stadium: Mercedes-Benz Stadium; Attendance: 42,648; Referee: Ted Unkel

March 25 5	Columbus Crew	6–1	Atlanta United FC	Columbus, OH
7:30 PM	Morris 14'; Ramirez 47', 64'; Quinton 51'; Russell-Rowe 68'; Arfsten 90+2'	Report	Lennon 71'	Stadium: Lower.com Field; Attendance: 19,249; Referee: Ramy Touchan

April 1 6	Atlanta United FC	1–0	New York Red Bulls	Atlanta, GA
7:30 PM	Giakoumakis 7'	Report		Stadium: Mercedes-Benz Stadium; Attendance: 43,511; Referee: Alex Chilowicz

April 8 7	New York City FC	1–1	Atlanta United FC	New York, NY
7:30 PM	Pereira 72'	Report	Giakoumakis 70'	Stadium: Yankee Stadium; Attendance: 20,095; Referee: Drew Fischer

April 15 8	Toronto FC	2–2	Atlanta United FC	Toronto, ON
7:30 PM	Laryea 43'; Servania 90+4'	Report	Giakoumakis 4'; Chol 76'	Stadium: BMO Field; Attendance: 27,892; Referee: Ted Unkel

April 23 9	Atlanta United FC	2–1	Chicago Fire	Atlanta, GA
4:30 PM	Giakoumakis 13'; Haile-Selassie 90+9' (o.g.)	Report	Przybyłko 90'	Stadium: Mercedes-Benz Stadium; Attendance: 43,335; Referee: Victor Rivas

April 29 10	Nashville SC	3–1	Atlanta United FC	Nashville, TN
1:30 PM	Picault 37'; Bunbury 56'; Shaffelburg 90+1'	Report	Almada 72' (pen.)	Stadium: Geodis Park; Attendance: 28,793; Referee: Joe Dickerson

May 6 11	Inter Miami CF	2–1	Atlanta United FC	Fort Lauderdale, FL
7:30 PM	Martínez 59' (pen.), 75'	Report	Gutman 90+2'	Stadium: DRV PNK Stadium; Attendance: 16,750; Referee: Armando Villarreal

May 13 12	Atlanta United FC	1–3	Charlotte FC	Atlanta, Georgia
7:30 PM	Gutman (red card) 51'; Ibarra (yellow card) 71'; Purata 86'; Lennon (yellow card) 87'	Report	Meram 18', 57'; Świderski 52' (pen.); Sobocinski (yellow card) 59'	Stadium: Mercedes-Benz Stadium; Attendance: 43,427; Referee: Lukasz Szpala

May 17 13	Atlanta United FC	4–0	Colorado Rapids	Atlanta, GA
7:30 PM	Almada 29'; Luiz Araújo 80'; Wolff 87'; Giakoumakis 90'	Report		Stadium: Mercedes-Benz Stadium; Attendance: 42,587; Referee: Fotis Bazakos

May 20 14	Chicago Fire	3–3	Atlanta United FC	Chicago, IL
8:30 PM	Purata 42' (o.g.); Haile-Selassie 49'; Koutsias 89'	Report	Gutman 29'; Giakoumakis 55', 65'	Stadium: Soldier Field; Attendance: 18,343; Referee: Rosendo Mendoza

May 27 15	Orlando City SC	1–1	Atlanta United FC	Orlando, FL
7:30 PM	Carlos (yellow card) 25'; Smith 30'	Report	Hernández (yellow card) 66'; Wolff 86'; Rossetto (yellow card) 90+4'	Stadium: Exploria Stadium; Attendance: 20,127; Referee: Allen Chapman

May 31 16	Atlanta United FC	3–3	New England Revolution	Atlanta, GA
7:00 PM	Ibarra (yellow card) 55'; Giakoumakis 56', (yellow card) 81'; Almada 74'; Guzan (yellow card) 83'; Berry 87'; Gutman (yellow card) 90+2'	Report	Gil 1', 90+3'; González (yellow card) 22'; Wood 37'; Buck (yellow card) 52'	Stadium: Mercedes-Benz Stadium; Attendance: 42,915; Referee: Rubiel Vazquez

June 7 17	Los Angeles FC	0–0	Atlanta United FC	Los Angeles, CA
10:30 am PM		Report		Stadium: BMO Stadium; Attendance: 22,010; Referee: Joseph Dickerson

June 10 18	Atlanta United FC	3–1	D.C. United	Atlanta, GA
7:30 PM	Giakoumakis 13', (yellow card) 83'; Fortune (yellow card) 42'; Gutman 49'; Wolff 73'	Report	Fountas 27'; Pines (yellow card) 51'; Birnbaum (yellow card) 69'; Klich (yellow card) 89'	Stadium: Mercedes-Benz Stadium; Attendance: 42,539; Referee: Filip Dujic

June 21 19	Atlanta United FC	2–2	New York City FC	Atlanta, GA
7:30 PM	Wolff 11'; Cobb (yellow card) 22'; Gutman (yellow card) 75'; Firmino 90+5'	Report	Pereira 1', 56'; Cufré (yellow card) 75'; Pellegrini (yellow card) 81'; Rodríguez (yellow card) 86'	Stadium: Mercedes-Benz Stadium; Attendance: 42,557; Referee: Jon Freemon

June 24 20	New York Red Bulls	4–0	Atlanta United FC	Harrison, NJ
7:30 PM	Edelman 32', (yellow card) 54'; Cásseres (yellow card) 37', (goal) 45'; Amaya 78', 90'	Report	Gutman (yellow card) 27'; Chol (yellow card) 82'	Stadium: Red Bull Arena; Attendance: 16,277; Referee: Rosendo Mendoza

July 2 21	Atlanta United FC	2–0	Philadelphia Union	Atlanta, GA
4:00 PM	Almada 7'; Sejdić (yellow card) 70'; Ibarra (yellow card) 75'; Lennon 79'	Report	Harriel (yellow card) 4'; Carranza (yellow card) 48'; Uhre (yellow card) 65'; Torres (yellow card) 90+3'	Stadium: Mercedes-Benz Stadium; Attendance: 43,527; Referee: Ted Unkel

July 8 22	CF Montréal	0–1	Atlanta United FC	Montreal, QC
7:30 PM	Camacho (yellow card) 53'; Kwizera (yellow card) 84'; Campbell (yellow card) 88'	Report	Lennon 54'; Almada (yellow card) 78'; Guzan (yellow card) 90+10'	Stadium: Stade Saputo; Attendance: 19,619; Referee: Ismir Pekmic

July 12 23	New England Revolution	2–1	Atlanta United FC	Foxborough, MA
7:30 PM	Polster 4', (yellow card) 69'; Vrioni 9'; Panayotou (yellow card) 82'	Report	Mosquera (yellow card) 80'; Chol 90+3'	Stadium: Gillette Stadium; Attendance: 17,615; Referee: Alex Chilowicz

July 15 24	Atlanta United FC	1–2	Orlando City SC	Atlanta, GA
7:30 PM	Wiley 22'; Alonso (yellow card) 59'; Giakoumakis (yellow card) 90+1'	Report	Cartagena (yellow card) 45+2'; Jansson (yellow card) 45+3'; Carlos 25', (yellow card) 90+6'; McGuire 60', (yellow card) 65'; Angulo (yellow card) 87'; Gallese (yellow card) 90+8'	Stadium: Mercedes-Benz Stadium; Attendance: 43,576; Referee: Víctor Rivas

August 20 25	Seattle Sounders FC	0–2	Atlanta United FC	Seattle, WA
10:30 am PM	Yeimar (yellow card) 8'	Report	Giakoumakis 11', 65'; Almada (yellow card) 26'; Mosquera (yellow card) 64'	Stadium: Lumen Field; Attendance: 31,149; Referee: Allen Chapman

August 26 26	Atlanta United FC	4–0	Nashville SC	Atlanta, GA
7:30 PM	Silva 26'; Muyumba (yellow card) 34'; Almada 46'; Robinson 57'; Wolff (yellow card) 66'; Lobzhanidze 87'	Report		Stadium: Mercedes-Benz Stadium; Attendance: 67,514; Referee: Jon Freemon

August 30 27	Atlanta United FC	1–2	FC Cincinnati	Atlanta, GA
7:30 PM	Mosquera 10'; Rossetto (yellow card) 60'; Muyumba (yellow card) 72'	Report	Nwobodo (yellow card) 41'; Acosta 75'; Vazquez 80'	Stadium: Mercedes-Benz Stadium; Attendance: 42,568; Referee: Armando Villarreal

September 2 28	FC Dallas	2–2	Atlanta United FC	Frisco, TX
8:30 PM	Arriola 4'; Velasco (yellow card) 53'; Kamungo 62'; Ibeagha (yellow card) 69'	Report	Sosa (yellow card) 7'; Giakoumakis (yellow card) 21', (goal) 44'; Lobzhanidze 58'	Stadium: Toyota Stadium; Attendance: 17,441; Referee: Ismir Pekmic

September 16 29	Atlanta United FC	5–2	Inter Miami CF	Atlanta, GA
7:30 PM	Muyumba (yellow card) 29', (goal) 36'; Miller 41' (o.g.); Lennon 44'; Abram (yellow card) 52'; Giakoumakis 76'; Wolff 89'	Report	Campana 25', 53' (pen.); Farías (yellow card) 57'; Stefanelli (yellow card) 86'	Stadium: Mercedes-Benz Stadium; Attendance: 71,635; Referee: Jair Marrufo

September 20 30	D.C. United	1–1	Atlanta United FC	Washington, DC
7:30 PM	Pirani 80'; Benteke (yellow card) 85'; Asad (yellow card) 88'	Report	Lobzhanidze 14'; Fortune (yellow card) 61'; Mosquera (yellow card) 77'; Silva (yellow card) 89'	Stadium: Audi Field; Attendance: 15,762; Referee: Lukasz Szpala

September 23 31	Atlanta United FC	4–1	CF Montréal	Atlanta, GA
7:30 PM	Silva 30'; Almada 33'; Giakoumakis 46'; Robinson (yellow card) 65'; Mosquera 89', (yellow card) 90+1'	Report	Hamdi 40'; Waterman (yellow card) 66' (yellow-red card) 87'; Choinière (yellow card) 79'	Stadium: Mercedes-Benz Stadium; Attendance: 42,569; Referee: Rubiel Vazquez

October 4 32	Philadelphia Union	3–2	Atlanta United FC	Chester, PA
7:30 PM	Elliott (yellow card) 34'; Gazdag 39'; Uhre 41'; Carranza 45+3'; Sullivan (yellow card) 66'; Martínez (yellow card) 75'; Harriel (yellow card) 81'	Report	Almada 56' (pen.); Thiaré (yellow card) 75'; Mosquera 77'	Stadium: Subaru Park; Attendance: 18,605; Referee: Alex Chilowicz

October 7 33	Atlanta United FC	1–1	Columbus Crew	Atlanta, GA
7:30 PM	Robinson 90+7'	Report	Hernández 65'	Stadium: Mercedes-Benz Stadium; Attendance: 42,684; Referee: Ismail Elfath

October 21 34	FC Cincinnati	2–2	Atlanta United FC	Cincinnati, OH
6:00 PM	Badji 25'; Acosta 45+2'; Miazga (yellow card) 72'	Report	Giakoumakis 12', 32'; Almada (yellow card) 36' (yellow-red card) 51'; Thiaré (yellow card) 85'	Stadium: TQL Stadium; Attendance: 25,513; Referee: Joseph Dickerson

=== MLS Cup Playoffs ===
==== Round One ====
November 1 Match 1	Columbus Crew	2–0	Atlanta United FC	Columbus, OH
7:30 pm ET	Hernández 45+1', 51' (pen.); Camacho (yellow card) 78'; Rossi (yellow card) 79'	Report	Muyumba (yellow card) 25'; Robinson (yellow card) 71'; Thiaré (yellow card) 77'	Stadium: Lower.com Field; Attendance: 20,176; Referee: Lukasz Szpala

November 7 Match 2	Atlanta United FC	4–2	Columbus Crew	Atlanta, GA
7:30 pm ET	Giakoumakis (yellow card) 18', (goal) 38'; Silva 45+4', (yellow card) 45+4'; Mosquera 83'; Almada 88'	Report	Hernández (yellow card) 41', (goal) 45'; Arfsten 90+5'	Stadium: Mercedes-Benz Stadium; Attendance: 41,850; Referee: Chris Penso

November 12 Match 3	Columbus Crew	4–2	Atlanta United FC	Columbus, OH
7:00 pm ET	Nagbe 9'; Amundsen 17', (yellow card) 73'; Mățan 33'; Rossi 47'; Camacho (yellow card) 71'	Report	Muyumba (yellow card) 27'; Giakoumakis 35'; Silva 50'; Fortune (yellow card) 81'; Thiaré (yellow card) 90'	Stadium: Lower.com Field; Attendance: 20,182; Referee: Armando Villarreal
Note: Columbus Crew won the series 2–1.

==== U.S. Open Cup ====
Atlanta United entered the Open Cup at the Third Round.

April 26 Third round	Atlanta United FC (Georgia (U.S. state))	1–2 (a.e.t.)	(Tennessee) Memphis 901	Kennesaw, GA
7:30PM	Wolff 3'	Report	Goodrum 90+6' (pen.); Pickering 100'	Stadium: Fifth Third Bank Stadium; Attendance: 3,034; Referee: Aleksandar Zhelyazkov

=== Leagues Cup ===
==== South 3 ====
Pos	Team	Pld	W	PW	PL	L	GF	GA	GD	Pts	Qualification
1	(United States) Inter Miami CF	2	2	0	0	0	6	1	+5	6	Advance to knockout stage
2	(Mexico) Cruz Azul	2	0	1	0	1	2	3	−1	2	Advance to knockout stage
3	(United States) Atlanta United FC	2	0	0	1	1	1	5	−4	1	

Source: Leagues Cup
Rules for classification: Tiebreakers

July 25 Group stage	Inter Miami CF (United States)	4–0	(United States) Atlanta United FC	Fort Lauderdale, FL
7:30 PM	Messi 8', 22'; Taylor 44', 53'	Report		Stadium: DRV PNK Stadium; Attendance: 19,758; Referee: Mario Escobar

July 29 Group stage	Cruz Azul (Mexico)	1–1 (5–4 p)	(United States) Atlanta United FC	Atlanta, GA
7:00 PM	Dueñas (yellow card) 7'; Moisés 20'; Salcedo (yellow card) 90'; Escobar (yellow card) 90+1'	Report	Lennon (yellow card) 6'; Sejdić (yellow card) 27'; Hernández (yellow card) 42'; Muyumba (yellow card) 53'; Almada 75'; Giakoumakis (yellow card) 90+2'	Stadium: Mercedes-Benz Stadium; Attendance: 41,108; Referee: Oliver Vergara
	Penalties
	Salcedo (penalty missed); Rivero (penalty scored); Tabó (penalty scored); Rotondi (penalty scored); Antuna (penalty scored); Lotti (penalty scored)		(penalty scored) Lennon; (penalty scored) Muyumba; (penalty missed) Berry; (penalty scored) Almada; (penalty scored) Giakoumakis; (penalty missed) Purata

== Statistics ==
=== Top scorers ===
As of November 13, 2023

Place	Position	Name	MLS	Playoffs	U.S. Open Cup	Leagues Cup	Total
1	FW	(Greece) Giorgos Giakoumakis	17	2	0	0	19
2	MF	(Argentina) Thiago Almada	11	1	0	1	13
3	MF	(United States) Tyler Wolff	5	0	1	0	6
4	DF	(United States) Brooks Lennon	4	0	0	0	4
4	MF	(Colombia) Edwin Mosquera	3	1	0	0	4
4	MF	(Portugal) Xande Silva	2	2	0	0	4
4	MF	(United States) Caleb Wiley	4	0	0	0	4
8	MF	(Brazil) Luiz Araújo	3	0	0	0	3
8	DF	(United States) Andrew Gutman	3	0	0	0	3
8	MF	(Georgia (country)) Saba Lobzhanidze	3	0	0	0	3
11	MF	(South Sudan) Machop Chol	2	0	0	0	2
11	DF	(United States) Miles Robinson	2	0	0	0	2
13	FW	(Spain) Miguel Berry	1	0	0	0	1
13	MF	(Brazil) Nicolas Firmino	1	0	0	0	1
13	MF	(France) Tristan Muyumba	1	0	0	0	1
13	DF	(Mexico) Juanjo Purata	1	0	0	0	1
13	MF	(Brazil) Matheus Rossetto	1	0	0	0	1
Own Goals			2	0	0	0	2
Total			66	6	1	1	74

=== Appearances and goals ===
As of 13 November 2023

No.	Pos	Player	Nat	MLS			Playoffs			Open Cup			Leagues Cup			Total		
No.	Pos	Player	Nat	App	St	Goal	App	St	Goal	App	St	Goal	App	St	Goal	App	St	Goal
Goalkeepers
1	GK	Brad Guzan	(United States)	27	27	0	3	3	0	–	–	–	2	2	0	32	32	0
25	GK	Clément Diop	(Senegal)	2	1	0	–	–	–	1	1	0	–	–	–	3	2	0
31	GK	Quentin Westberg	(United States)	6	6	0	–	–	–	–	–	–	–	–	–	6	6	0
Defenders
2	DF	Ronald Hernández	(Venezuela)	10	8	0	1	1	0	1	1	0	2	1	0	14	11	0
4	DF	Luis Abram	(Peru)	22	16	0	3	3	0	1	1	0	2	2	0	28	22	0
11	DF	Brooks Lennon	(United States)	33	32	4	3	3	0	1	0	0	2	2	0	39	37	4
12	DF	Miles Robinson	(United States)	27	26	2	3	3	0	–	–	–	2	2	0	32	31	2
22	DF	Juanjo Purata	(Mexico)	28	24	1	1	0	0	1	0	0	2	1	0	32	25	1
24	DF	Noah Cobb	(United States)	3	2	0	–	–	–	1	1	0	–	–	–	4	3	0
26	DF	Caleb Wiley	(United States)	30	28	4	3	3	0	1	1	0	2	2	0	36	34	4
'Midfielders
5	MF	Santiago Sosa	(Argentina)	17	11	0	–	–	–	–	–	–	1	1	0	18	12	0
6	MF	Osvaldo Alonso	(Cuba)	7	0	0	–	–	–	–	–	–	2	0	0	9	0	0
8	MF	Tristan Muyumba	(France)	10	9	1	3	3	0	–	–	–	1	1	0	14	13	1
9	MF	Saba Lobzhanidze	(Georgia (country))	9	6	3	3	2	0	–	–	–	1	1	0	12	8	3
10	MF	Thiago Almada	(Argentina)	31	31	11	2	2	1	–	–	–	2	2	1	35	35	13
13	MF	Amar Sejdić	(United States)	23	14	0	–	–	–	1	1	0	1	1	0	25	16	0
16	MF	Xande Silva	(Portugal)	10	8	2	3	3	2	–	–	–	–	–	–	13	11	4
18	MF	Derrick Etienne Jr.	(Haiti)	21	11	0	2	0	0	1	0	0	1	0	0	25	11	0
20	MF	Matheus Rossetto	(Brazil)	30	19	1	2	2	0	–	–	–	2	2	0	34	23	1
21	MF	Edwin Mosquera	(Colombia)	12	4	3	3	0	1	–	–	–	2	0	0	17	4	4
28	MF	Tyler Wolff	(United States)	18	6	5	3	0	0	1	1	1	1	1	0	23	8	6
30	MF	Machop Chol	(South Sudan)	19	4	2	–	–	–	1	0	0	–	–	–	20	4	2
35	MF	Ajani Fortune	(Trinidad and Tobago)	14	3	0	3	2	0	1	1	0	–	–	–	18	6	0
51	MF	Nicolas Firmino	(Brazil)	1	0	1	–	–	–	–	–	–	–	–	–	1	0	1
52	MF	Luke Brennan	(United States)	1	0	0	–	–	–	–	–	–	–	–	–	1	0	0
Forwards
7	FW	Giorgos Giakoumakis	(Greece)	27	21	17	3	3	2	–	–	–	2	2	0	32	26	19
19	FW	Miguel Berry	(Spain)	27	10	1	–	–	–	1	1	0	2	0	0	30	11	1
29	FW	Jamal Thiaré	(Senegal)	4	0	0	3	0	0	–	–	–	–	–	–	7	0	0
Players who have played for Atlanta United this season but have left the club
~~10~~	MF	Luiz Araújo	(Brazil)	16	15	3	–	–	–	1	1	0	–	–	–	17	16	3
~~14~~	MF	Franco Ibarra	(Argentina)	17	15	0	–	–	–	1	1	0	–	–	–	18	16	0
~~15~~	DF	Andrew Gutman	(United States)	18	16	3	–	–	–	1	0	0	–	–	–	19	16	3
~~32~~	FW	Erik López	(Paraguay)	1	0	0	–	–	–	–	–	–	–	–	–	1	0	0
~~36~~	FW	Jackson Conway	(United States)	1	1	0	–	–	–	–	–	–	–	–	–	1	1	0
Total				34		66	2		4	1		1	2		1	39		72
