= Jay Fortune =

Trinidadian footballer (born 2002)

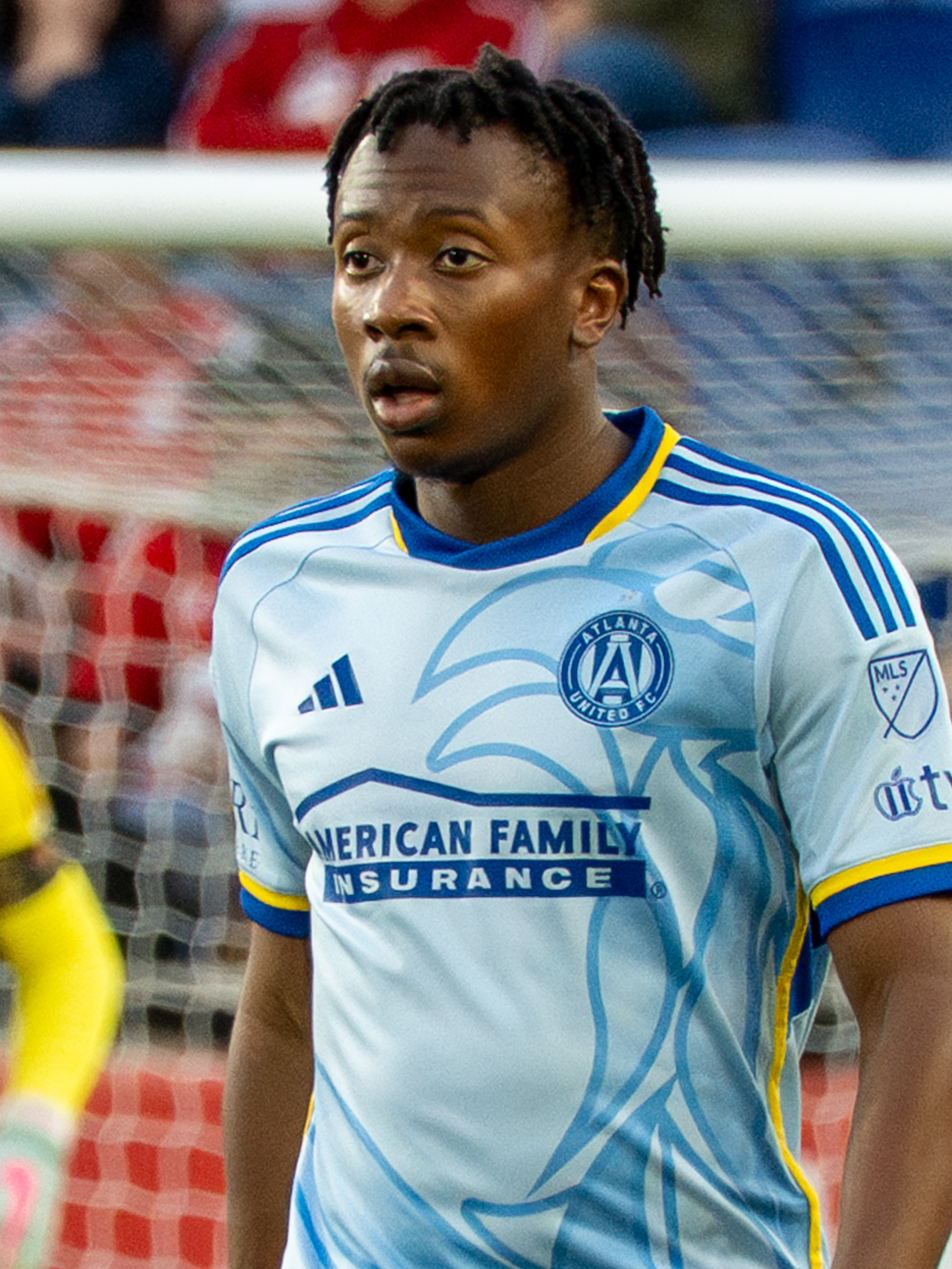
- Fortune in 2025

Personal information
- Date of birth: 30 December 2002 (age 23)
- Place of birth: Raleigh, North Carolina, United States
- Height: 1.73 m (5 ft 8 in)
- Position: Attacking midfielder

Team information
- Current team: Atlanta United
- Number: 35

Youth career
- 2018–2021: Atlanta United

Senior career*
Years	Team	Apps	(Gls)
2020–	Atlanta United 2	70	(4)
2023–	Atlanta United	75	(5)

International career^{‡}
2019	Trinidad and Tobago U17	4	(0)
2021–	Trinidad and Tobago	8	(1)
- * Club domestic league appearances and goals as of 13:24, 15 November 2026 (UTC) ‡ National team caps and goals as of 6 June 2024

Ajani "Jay" Fortune (born 30 December 2002) is a Trinidadian professional footballer who plays as an attacking midfielder for Major League Soccer club Atlanta United. Born in the United States, he plays for the Trinidad and Tobago national team.

== Club career ==
On 11 July 2020, at just 17 years-old, Fortune made his professional debut for Atlanta United 2, the USL Championship affiliate of Atlanta United. That same season, Fortune scored his first professional goal against Miami FC with a right-footed strike from outside the box.

On 27 August 2021, Fortune signed a professional contract with Atlanta United 2.

After a series of impressive performances for Atlanta United 2, Atlanta United rewarded Fortune with a first-team contract at the club, becoming only the 14th player in franchise history to transition from the academy to the first-team. Fortune was then named by head coach, former West Ham United midfielder, Jack Collison as team captain for Atlanta United 2 for the remainder of the 2022 USL season.

Fortune made his Major League Soccer debut against Charlotte FC on 11 March 2023, becoming the youngest Trinidad and Tobago national team player to do so. On 10 June, Fortune made his first career start for Atlanta United against D.C. United.

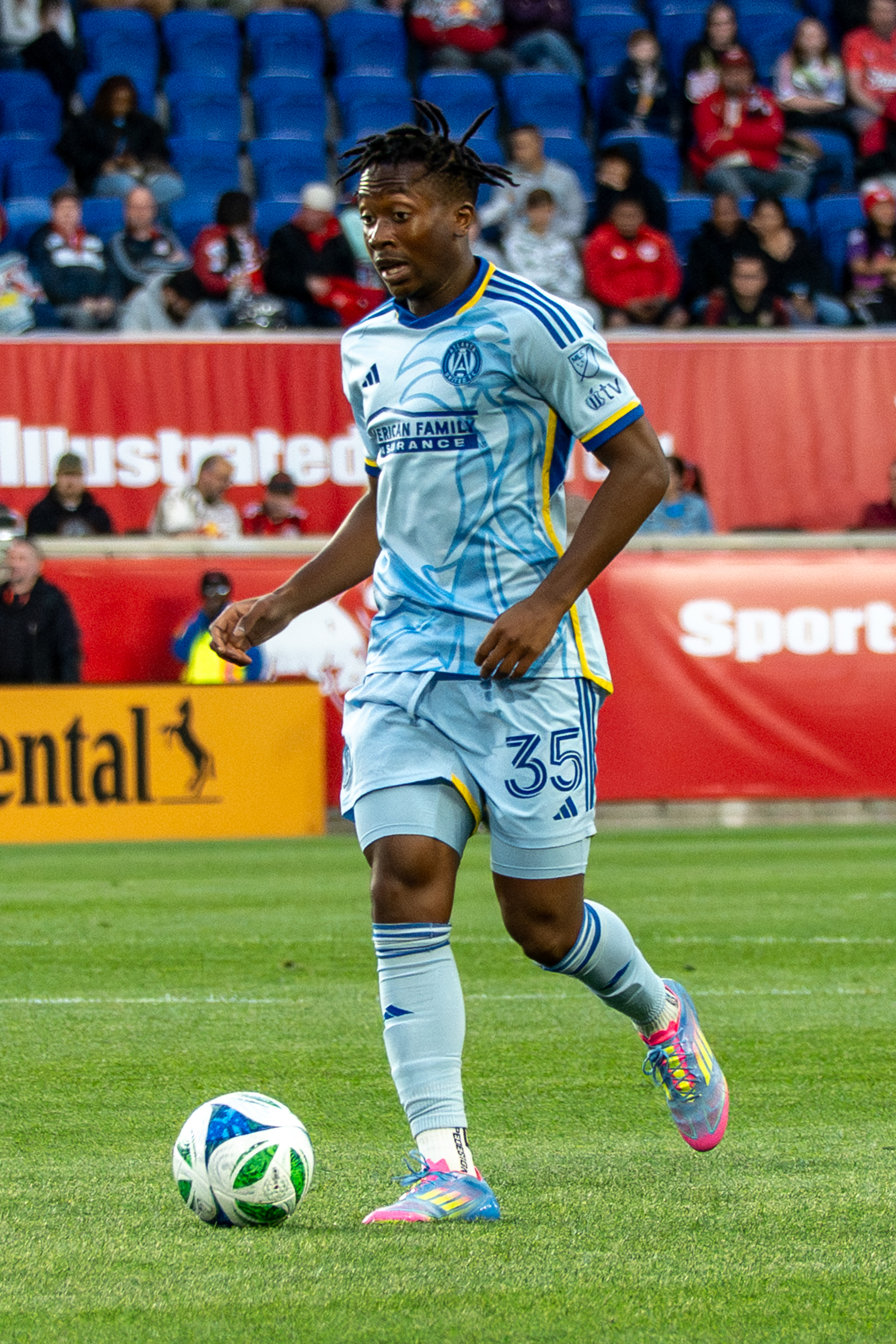
Ajani Fortune during New York Red Bulls vs Atlanta United on May 31 2025

== International career ==
=== Youth ===
Fortune was selected for the Trinidad and Tobago U-17 National Team for the 2019 CONCACAF Under-17 Championship. Fortune played all four games for Trinidad and Tobago as the team were eliminated in the second round of the tournament.

=== Senior ===
At 18-years-old, Fortune received his first senior call-up in January 2021 ahead of a friendly with the United States. He made his debut in the game, as a starter.

In June 2023, Fortune was named to the 23-man squad for the 2023 CONCACAF Gold Cup. In Trinidad's opening game of the tournament against Saint Kitts and Nevis on June 25, he scored his first goal, netting the second in an eventual 3–0 victory.

== Personal ==
Fortune's brother, Dre, is also a professional footballer.

== Career statistics ==
=== Club ===
As of match played 2 June 2026

Appearances and goals by club, season and competition
Club	Season	League			National cup		Continental		Other		Total	
Club	Season	Division	Apps	Goals	Apps	Goals	Apps	Goals	Apps	Goals	Apps	Goals
Atlanta United 2	2020	USL Championship	11	1	—		—		—		11	1
Atlanta United 2	2021	USL Championship	23	2	—		—		—		23	2
Atlanta United 2	2022	USL Championship	24	0	—		—		—		24	0
Atlanta United 2	2023	MLS Next Pro	11	1	—		—		—		11	1
Atlanta United 2	Total		69	4	—		—		—		69	4
Atlanta United	2023	MLS	14	0	1	0	0	0	3 (Note: Appearance(s) in MLS Cup playoffs)	0	18	0
Atlanta United	2024	MLS	27	1	2	0	2 (Note: Appearance(s) in Leagues Cup)	0	5	0	36	1
Atlanta United	2025	MLS	15	1	—		0	0	—		15	1
Atlanta United	2026	MLS	9	2	3	0					12	2
Atlanta United	Total		65	4	3	0	2	0	8	0	81	4
Career total			134	8	6	0	2	0	8	0	150	8

=== International ===
As of match played 22 June 2025

Appearances and goals by national team and year
National team	Year	Apps	Goals
Trinidad and Tobago	2021	1	0
Trinidad and Tobago	2022	3	0
Trinidad and Tobago	2023	2	1
Trinidad and Tobago	2024	2	0
Trinidad and Tobago	2025	6	1
Total		14	2

Scores and results list Trinidad and Tobago's goal tally first, score column indicates score after each Fortune goal.

List of international goals scored by Ajani Fortune
No.	Date	Venue	Opponent	Score	Result	Competition	Ref.
1	25 June 2023	DRV PNK Stadium, Fort Lauderdale, United States	Saint Kitts and Nevis	2–0	3–0	2023 CONCACAF Gold Cup	
2	6 June 2025	Hasely Crawford Stadium, Port of Spain, Trinidad and Tobago	Saint Kitts and Nevis	5–2	6–2	2026 FIFA World Cup qualification	
