= Saba Lobzhanidze (footballer) =

Georgian footballer (born 1994)

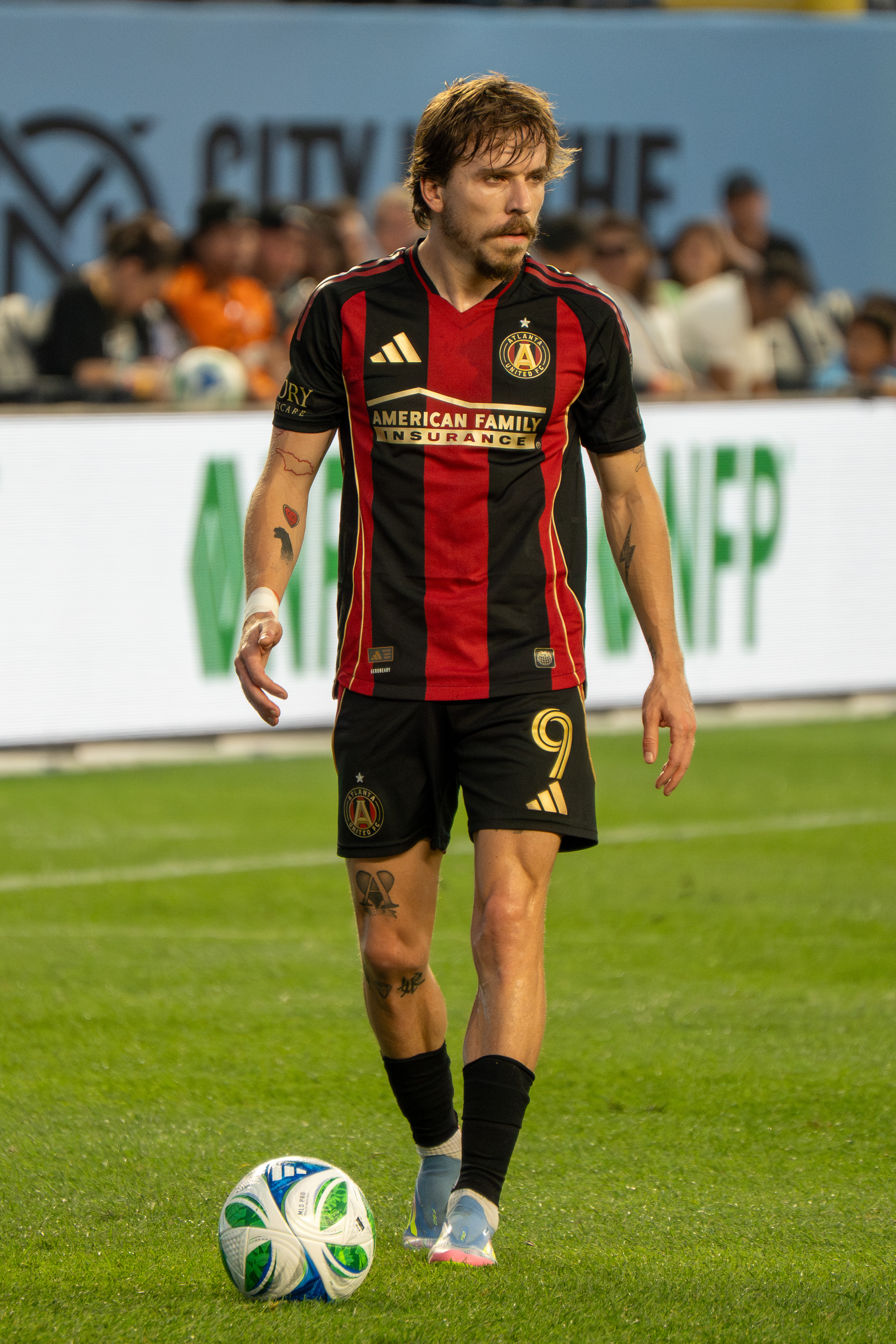
- Lobzhanidze in 2025

Personal information
- Date of birth: 18 December 1994 (age 31)
- Place of birth: Tbilisi, Georgia
- Height: 1.75 m (5 ft 9 in)
- Position: Right winger

Team information
- Current team: Real Salt Lake
- Number: 12

Youth career
- 2004–2007: Norchi Dinamoeli
- 2007–2009: Tbilisi
- 2009–2013: Dinamo Tbilisi

Senior career*
Years	Team	Apps	(Gls)
2013–2014	Dinamo Tbilisi II	19	(5)
2014–2017	Dinamo Tbilisi	59	(12)
2016	→ Chikhura Sachkhere (loan)	11	(10)
2017–2019	Randers	84	(28)
2020–2021	MKE Ankaragücü	52	(4)
2021–2023	Hatayspor	61	(9)
2023	→ Fatih Karagumruk (loan)	10	(2)
2023–2026	Atlanta United	85	(14)
2026–	Real Salt Lake	5	(0)

International career^{‡}
2012–2013	Georgia U19	4	(0)
2014–2016	Georgia U21	8	(3)
2017–	Georgia	40	(4)
- * Club domestic league appearances and goals as of 19 August 2026 ‡ National team caps and goals as of 7 September 2025 (UTC)

Saba Lobzhanidze (Order of Honor) (Georgian: საბა ლობჟანიძე, romanized: saba lobzhanidze, Georgian pronunciation: [saba lobʒanidze]; born 18 December 1994) is a Georgian professional footballer who plays for Major League Soccer club Real Salt Lake and the Georgia national team.

== Club career ==
Born in Tbilisi, Lobzhanidze started playing for Norchi Dinamoeli at the age of 10. Later he joined Dinamo Tbilisi.

=== Randers ===
In June 2017, Lobzhanidze signed a three-year contract with Randers. In April 2018, in six games Lobzhanidze scored six times for Randers, including a hat-trick against Sønderjyske, which won him the Player of the Month award among Georgian football players. Besides, he was twice named in team of the week in the Danish Superliga.

=== MKE Ankaragücü ===
On 30 January 2020, Lobzhanidze signed with Turkish club MKE Ankaragücü. He made his debut on 2 February in a 1–1 league draw against Kasımpaşa.

=== Hatayspor ===
In June 2021, Lobzhanidze signed a three-year contract with Hatayspor, after Ankaragücü had relegated from the Süper Lig.

Following a devastating earthquake in Turkey and subsequent withdrawal of Hatayspor from the league in February 2023, he joined Fatih Karagümrük on loan until the end of the season.

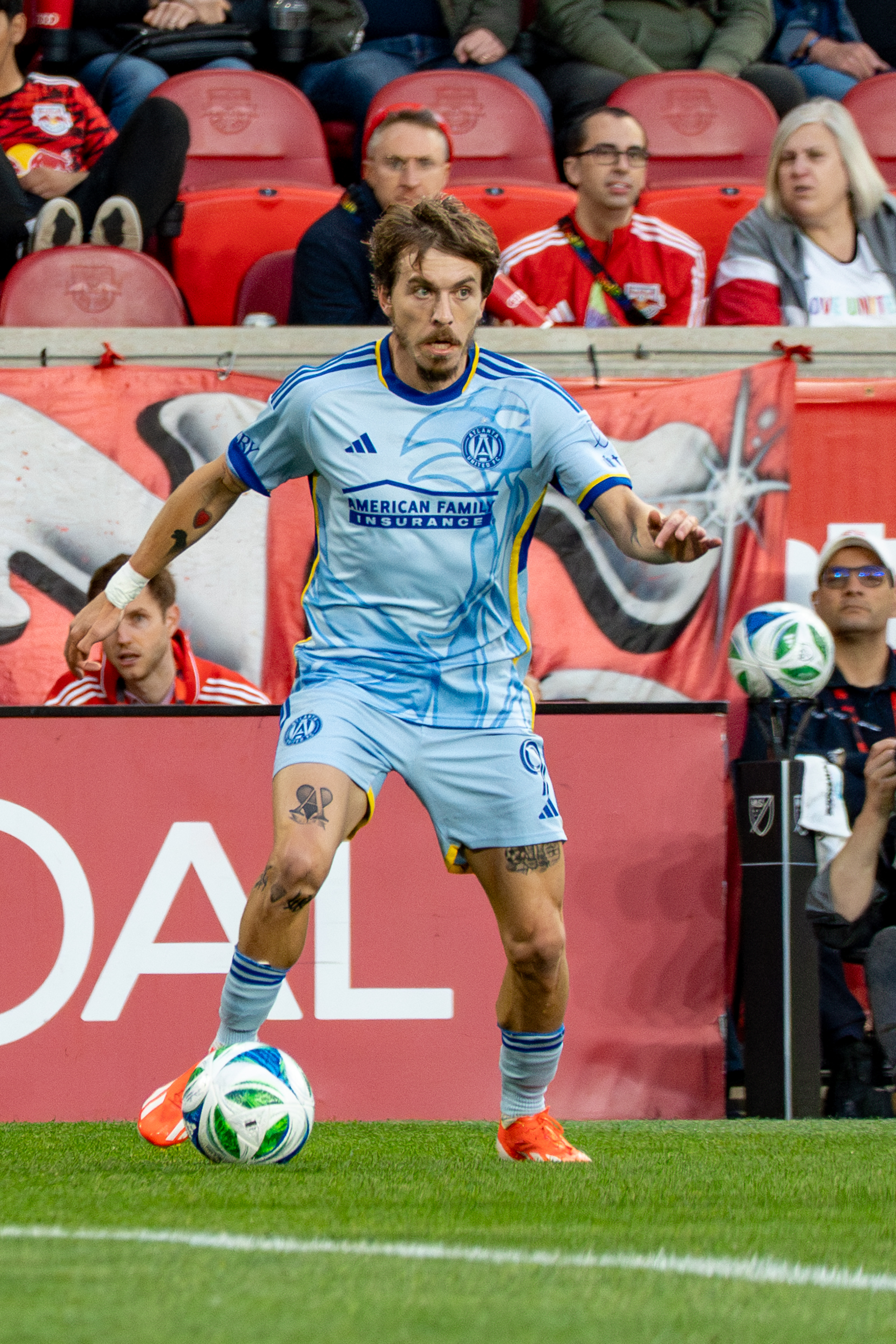
Saba Lobzhanidze with Atlanta United in 2025

=== Atlanta United ===
In early August 2023, Lobzhanidze moved to MLS club Atlanta United on a three-year deal. He finished the 2023 MLS Regular Season with 3 goals and 4 assists in 9 games.

On 30 May 2024, Saba Lobzhanidze was named Player of the Matchday after his first career MLS brace guided Atlanta United to 3-1 win at Inter Miami CF. On 20 July 2024, Lobzhanidze became the sixth player in club history to record at least 20 goal contributions in their first 30 matches with the team. Lobzhanidze finished the MLS Regular Season with 9 goals and 3 assists in 30 matches. His goal on the final matchday of the season against Orlando City helped Atlanta United to earn a spot in the 2024 MLS Cup Playoffs. He then went on to score against Inter Miami CF on 25 October 2024 in the first game of the series. Atlanta United went on to win the series against Inter Miami.

=== Real Salt Lake ===
On 1 July 2026, Atlanta United traded Lobzhanidze and a third-round pick in the MLS SuperDraft to Real Salt Lake for up to $725,000 in General Allocation Money.

== International career ==
Lobzhanidze made his debut for the Georgia national team on 23 January 2017 in a friendly against Uzbekistan, scoring one of the two goals of his team.

In 2024, Lobzhanidze was called up by Georgia for the 2024 European Championships.

== Career statistics ==
=== Club ===
As of match played 2 June 2026

Appearances and goals by club, season and competition
Club	Season	League			National cup (Note: Includes Georgian Cup, Danish Cup, Turkish Cup)		Continental		Other		Total	
Club	Season	Division	Apps	Goals	Apps	Goals	Apps	Goals	Apps	Goals	Apps	Goals
Dinamo Tbilisi II	2012–13	Pirveli Liga	1	0	–		–		–		1	0
Dinamo Tbilisi II	2013–14	Pirveli Liga	18	5	–		–		–		18	5
Dinamo Tbilisi II	Total		19	5	0	0	0	0	0	0	19	5
Dinamo Tbilisi	2014–15	Umaglesi Liga	24	1	6	1	–		1 (Note: Appearance in Supercup)	0	31	2
Dinamo Tbilisi	2015–16	Umaglesi Liga	15	2	1	0	–		–		16	2
Dinamo Tbilisi	2017	Erovnuli Liga	13	7	–		–		–		13	7
Dinamo Tbilisi	Total		52	10	7	1	0	0	1	0	60	11
Chikhura (loan)	2016	Umaglesi Liga	12	9	3	2	2 (Note: Appearances in UEFA Europa League qualification round)	0	–		17	11
Randers	2017–18	Danish Superliga	29	9	2	1	–		(Note: Appearances in play-offs)4	3	35	13
Randers	2018–19	Danish Superliga	37	8	–		–		–		37	8
Randers	2019–20	Danish Superliga	15	8	–		–		–		15	8
Randers	Total		81	25	2	1	0	0	4	3	87	29
MKE Ankaragücü	2019–20	Süper Lig	15	1	–		–		–		15	1
MKE Ankaragücü	2020–21	Süper Lig	37	3	1	0	–		–		38	3
MKE Ankaragücü	Total		52	4	1	0	0	0	0	0	53	4
Hatayspor	2021–22	Süper Lig	37	8	3	0	–		–		40	8
Hatayspor	2022–23	Süper Lig	21	1	–		–		–		21	1
Hatayspor	Total		58	9	3	0	0	0	0	0	61	9
Fatih Karagümrük (loan)	2022–23	Süper Lig	10	2	–		–		–		10	2
Atlanta United	2023	MLS	12	3	0	0	–		3 (Note: Appearances in MLS Cup Playoffs)	0	15	3
Atlanta United	2024	MLS	35	10	1	0	2 (Note: Appearances in Leagues Cup)	1	–		38	11
Atlanta United	2025	MLS	33	0	–		3–1		–		36	1
Atlanta United	2026	MLS	13	2	1	0					14	2
Atlanta United	Total		93	13	2	0	5	1	3	0	103	17
Career total			377	79	18	4	7	2	8	3	410	88

=== International ===
As of 7 September 2025

Appearances and goals by national team and year
National team	Year	Apps	Goals
Georgia	2017	3	1
Georgia	2018	2	0
Georgia	2019	3	1
Georgia	2020	5	0
Georgia	2021	9	0
Georgia	2022	7	0
Georgia	2023	6	1
Georgia	2024	2	0
Georgia	2025	3	1
Total		40	4

Scores and results list Georgia's goal tally first, score column indicates score after each Lobzhanidze goal.

List of international goals scored by Saba Lobzhanidze
No.	Date	Venue	Opponent	Score	Result	Competition
1	23 January 2017	The Sevens Stadium, Dubai, United Arab Emirates	Uzbekistan	2–1	2–2	Friendly
2	10 June 2019	Parken Stadium, Copenhagen, Denmark	Denmark	1–1	1–5	UEFA Euro 2020 qualification
3	25 March 2023	Batumi Stadium, Batumi, Georgia	Mongolia	6–1	6–1	Friendly
4	8 June 2025	Ramaz Shengelia Stadium, Kutaisi, Georgia	Cape Verde	1–0	1–1	Friendly

== Honours ==
Dinamo Tbilisi

- Georgian League: 2015–16
- Georgian Cup: 2014-15, 2015-16
- Super Cup: 2015
