= Giorgos Giakoumakis =

Greek footballer (born 1994)

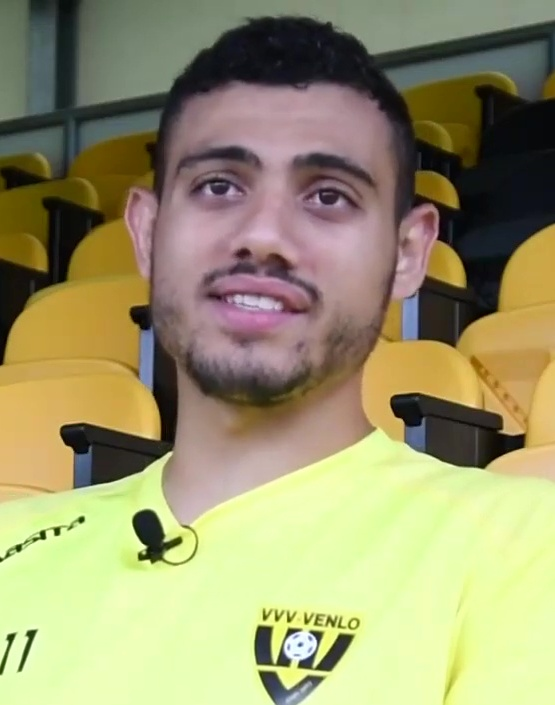
- Giakoumakis in 2021

Personal information
- Full name: Georgios Giakoumakis
- Date of birth: 9 December 1994 (age 31)
- Place of birth: Heraklion, Greece
- Height: 1.85 m (6 ft 1 in)
- Position: Striker

Team information
- Current team: Al Ain
- Number: 7

Youth career
- 2009–2011: Atsalenios

Senior career*
Years	Team	Apps	(Gls)
2011–2012	Atsalenios	23	(8)
2012–2017	Platanias	59	(14)
2014	→ Episkopi (loan)	11	(2)
2017–2020	AEK Athens	30	(2)
2019	→ OFI (loan)	10	(2)
2020	→ Górnik Zabrze (loan)	12	(3)
2020–2021	VVV-Venlo	30	(26)
2021–2023	Celtic	40	(19)
2023–2024	Atlanta United	38	(22)
2024–2026	Cruz Azul	34	(9)
2025–2026	→ PAOK (loan)	22	(7)
2026–	Al Ain	5	(1)

International career
2015	Greece U21	3	(0)
2020–2024	Greece	22	(4)
- * Club domestic league appearances and goals as of 20 October 2026

Giorgos Giakoumakis (Greek: Γιώργος Γιακουμάκης; born 9 December 1994) is a Greek professional footballer who plays as a striker for UAE Pro League club Al Ain.

== Club career ==
=== Early career ===
Giakoumakis was born and grew up in Heraklion, Crete, where he started his career in local teams. He began his professional career Atsalenios in his hometown, Heraklion. In 2012, he signed for Platanias, in Chania and he debuted for the club in a 3–2 win against Skoda Xanthi, coming in as a substitute in the 78th minute. In January 2014 he signed for Episkopi in Rethymno on loan until the end of the season and he made a total of 11 appearances and scoring two goals. He returned to Platanias, starting playing more often in the 2014–15 season and on 26 April 2015, he scored his first Super League goal, in a 2–0 home win Panetolikos.

=== AEK Athens ===
On 26 June 2017, Giakoumakis left Crete to join one of Athens' major clubs, AEK Athens on a four-year contract. On 20 December, he scored his first goal with the club in a 4–0 away Greek Cup win against Panetolikos. On 4 February, he scored as a late substitute in stoppage time in 2–1 away win game against champions Olympiacos. It was his first goal in Super League with AEK.

He scored his first goal for the 2018–19 season, in a 2–1 home win against Lamia for the Greek Cup, taking advantage of Lucas Boyé's excellent solo effort.

==== Loans to OFI and Górnik Zabrze ====
On 24 January 2019, after a year-and-a-half with AEK Athens, Giakoumakis returned briefly to his hometown in Crete to join the island's biggest team, OFI. He signed a six-month contract as part of the club's effort to avoid relegation, with an undisclosed purchase option for the summer of 2019. On 17 March 2019, he scored his first goal with the club in a crucial 2–0 home win over fellow strugglers Levadiakos to climb above their Super League rivals, however both clubs still sit in the relegation zone.

On 3 March 2020, he was loaned out to Ekstraklasa club Górnik Zabrze for the remainder of the current football season. On 30 May 2020, Giakoumakis scored the winning goal for Górnik Zabrze against ŁKS Łódź sealing a vital 1–0 away win for his club. On 23 June 2020, Giakoumakis scored his third goal for Górnik Zabrze in the Ekstraklasa, while teammate Stavros Vasilantonopoulos registered his second marker for the club in the same match. The Greek striker connected with a low pass across the box, neatly turning the ball beyond the goalkeeper into the far right corner, sealing a 3–1 away win against ŁKS Łódź.

=== VVV-Venlo ===
On 11 August 2020, Giakoumakis moved to VVV-Venlo. He signed a two-year contract with an option for an additional year with the Dutch club, while AEK Athens received a transfer fee of €600,000. On 12 September, in his first game for VVV, Giakoumakis led his new club to win against FC Emmen by scoring a hat trick in the 2020–21 Eredivisie opener. The Greek forward scored all his goals in the second half, overturning the score, as the hosts were leading up to that point with 2–0.

On 14 January 2021, Giakoumakis scored all four goals in a 4–1 away victory at ADO Den Haag. Two weeks later, on 28 January 2021, he again scored all four goals in a 4–1 victory: this time at home to Vitesse, and joined former Ajax striker Luis Suárez as the only players in the 21st century to have twice scored four goals in a single Eredivisie game. He was voted Eredivisie Player of the Month for January, having scored the most goals in Netherlands in a calendar month since 1985, and the second-most to Marco Van Basten's 12 with Ajax.

On 14 March, VVV-Venlo may have suffered its seventh consecutive defeat in the Eredivisie, however Giakoumakis with the goal he scored against Fortuna Sittard in an 3–1 home loss, made history as he caught Hans Sleven, who in the 1958–59 season had scored 24 goals in one year, rising to the fifth place of the scorers of all times for the club. On 13 May, Giakoumakis scored in VVV-Venlo's defeat in a crucial match against champions Ajax. After a reasonably good start to the competition, the club was unable to win the last fourteen matches in the league and was relegated while Giakoumakis became top scorer of Eredivisie.

=== Celtic ===
During the summer window, Giakoumakis was wanted by various clubs, with German club Werder Bremen agreeing a transfer fee with Venlo. On 31 August 2021, the last day of the summer transfer window, he signed for Scottish Premiership club Celtic on a five-year contract for a fee of £2.5 million. A month later, he made his debut as a substitute in a 4–0 home loss against Bayer Leverkusen in the UEFA Europa League. On 23 October, Giakoumakis scored his first goal for Celtic, opening the scoring in a 2–0 league win against St Johnstone. On 22 January 2022, Giakoumakis started for the first time in three months and rewarded Ange Postecoglou with a goal in a 2–1 away win over Alloa Athletic in the fourth round of the Scottish Cup. On 26 January, he scored in a vital 2–1 away win against Heart of Midlothian.

On 20 February, Giakoumakis scored a hat-trick in a 3–2 win against Dundee. On 14 March, Giakoumakis scored twice to help beat Dundee United and book their place in the semi-finals of the Scottish Cup. On 19 March, he scored his second hat-trick in five games as Celtic beat in-form Ross County 4–0 to move six points clear of Rangers at the top of the table. His efforts in March earned him the SPFL Player of The Month award. On 11 May, Giakoumakis scored in a 1–1 draw at Dundee United which secured the 2021–22 Scottish Premiership title for Celtic. On the final day of the season, Giakoumakis scored a double after coming off the bench against Motherwell to become the joint top goalscorer in the league. This was despite playing in only 21 games, which was 16 fewer than Regan Charles-Cook who also scored 13. His performances that season led to him becoming a popular player amongst the Celtic support, who made a chant in his honour based on German band Nena's single 99 Luftballons.

On 8 October, Giakoumakis scored a dramatic 95th-minute winner in a 2–1 victory at St Johnstone; only a few minutes after the home side had equalised via Alex Mitchell. He would go on to make appearances in the UEFA Champions League for Celtic, starting in their opening group stage match against Real Madrid. He scored in a 1–1 draw at home against Shakhtar Donetsk on 25 October.

In December, media reports emerged claiming that Giakoumakis was unhappy with terms offered to him by Celtic in contract negotiations. He was linked with a move to Saudi Arabia. Giakoumakis later became linked to both Atlanta United and Urawa Red Diamonds in January, with multiple reports indicating Atlanta offering a transfer fee of £4.3 million. Celtic confirmed his transfer on 8 February 2023.

=== Atlanta United ===
On 5 March 2023, Giakoumakis made his MLS debut, playing in Atlanta's 1–1 draw with Toronto FC. On 8 November 2023, in Atlanta's 4–2 win over Columbus Crew, the Greek striker became the first player in club history to contribute to three goals in a single MLS Cup Playoffs match. On 28 November 2023, Giakoumakis was included in the selection of the Best XI presented by Continental Tire, which recognizes the league's top players at each position as determined by members of the media, MLS players and MLS club technical staffs. On 9 March 2024, Giakoumakis scored his first hat-trick for the club in a 4–1 win over New England Revolution. He tallied 24 goals and seven assists in 43 matches across all competitions for Atlanta.

=== Cruz Azul ===
On 16 June 2024, Giakoumakis joined Mexican club Cruz Azul. The Greek international departs for a reported $10 million, opening a Designated Player spot as Atlanta enter the summer transfer window. He initially joined in February 2023 from Scotland's Celtic FC, earning 2023 MLS All-Star Game, Best XI and MLS Newcomer of the Year Award honors last year while helping replace club legend Josef Martínez.

==== Loan to PAOK ====
On 13 August 2025, Giakoumakis returned to his home country to join PAOK on a one-year loan and has a purchase option for the summer set at €5 million.

=== Al Ain FC ===
On 9 July 2026, Giakoumakis joined Al Ain FC from the United Arab Emirates announcing that he had reached an agreement with Cruz Azul for his acquisition.

== International career ==
On 11 November 2020, Giakoumakis scored on his debut for the Greece national team against Cyprus in a 2–1 victory. On 12 June 2022, Giakoumakis scored again for Greece against Kosovo in the UEFA Nations League.

== Personal life ==
Giakoumakis who was born in Heraklion, Crete, is of Romani origins, and comes from a family that has produced footballers in three generations.

== Career statistics ==
=== Club ===
As of match played 17 May 2026

Appearances and goals by club, season and competition
Club	Season	League			National cup (Note: Includes Greek Football Cup, KNVB Cup, Scottish Cup)		League cup (Note: Includes Scottish League Cup)		Continental		Other		Total	
Club	Season	Division	Apps	Goals	Apps	Goals	Apps	Goals	Apps	Goals	Apps	Goals	Apps	Goals
Platanias	2012–13	Super League Greece	9	0	3	0	—		—		—		12	0
Platanias	2013–14	Super League Greece	5	0	0	0	—		—		—		5	0
Platanias	2014–15	Super League Greece	9	1	1	0	—		—		—		10	1
Platanias	2015–16	Super League Greece	10	2	0	0	—		—		—		10	2
Platanias	2016–17	Super League Greece	26	11	4	1	—		—		—		30	12
Platanias	Total		59	14	8	1	—		—		—		67	15
Episkopi (loan)	2013–14	Football League	11	2	—		—		—		—		11	2
AEK Athens	2017–18	Super League Greece	11	1	6	1	—		4 (Note: One appearance in UEFA Champions League, three appearances in UEFA Europa League)	0	—		21	2
AEK Athens	2018–19	Super League Greece	6	0	2	1	—		3 (Note: Appearances in UEFA Champions League)	0	—		11	1
AEK Athens	2019–20	Super League Greece	13	0	1	0	—		2 (Note: Appearances in UEFA Europa League)	0	—		16	0
AEK Athens	Total		30	1	9	2	—		9	0	—		48	3
OFI (loan)	2018–19	Super League Greece	10	2	0	0	—		—		—		10	2
Górnik Zabrze (loan)	2019–20	Ekstraklasa	12	3	—		—		—		—		12	3
VVV-Venlo	2020–21	Eredivisie	30	26	3	3	—		—		—		33	29
Celtic	2021–22	Scottish Premiership	21	13	3	4	0	0	5 (Note: Three appearances in UEFA Europa League, two appearances in UEFA Europa Conference League)	0	—		29	17
Celtic	2022–23	Scottish Premiership	19	6	0	0	3	2	6	1	—		28	9
Celtic	Total		40	19	3	4	3	2	11	1	—		57	26
Atlanta United FC	2023	MLS	27	17	0	0	—		—		5 (Note: Two appearances in Leagues Cup, three appearances and two goals in MLS Cup Playoffs)	2	32	19
Atlanta United FC	2024	MLS	11	5	0	0	—		—		—		11	5
Atlanta United FC	Total		38	22	0	0	—		—		5	2	43	24
Cruz Azul	2024–25	Liga MX	34	9	—		—		2 (Note: Appearances in CONCACAF Champions Cup)	0	4 (Note: Appearances in Leagues Cup)	0	40	9
PAOK (loan)	2025–26	Super League Greece	22	7	5	3	—		9 (Note: Appearances in UEFA Europa League)	5	—		36	15
Al Ain	2026–27	UAE Pro League	0	0	0	0	—		0	0	—		0	0
Career total			286	105	28	13	3	2	31	6	9	2	357	128

=== International ===
Appearances and goals by national team and year
National team	Year	Apps	Goals
Greece	2020	3	1
Greece	2021	3	0
Greece	2022	5	1
Greece	2023	9	2
Greece	2024	2	0
Total		22	4

Scores and results list Greece's goal tally first, score column indicates score after each Giakoumakis goal.

List of international goals scored by Giorgos Giakoumakis
No.	Date	Venue	Opponent	Score	Result	Competition
1	11 November 2020	Georgios Kamaras Stadium, Athens, Greece	Cyprus	2–0	2–1	Friendly
2	12 June 2022	Panthessaliko Stadium, Volos, Greece	Kosovo	1–0	2–0	2022–23 UEFA Nations League C
3	13 October 2023	Aviva Stadium, Dublin, Republic of Ireland	Republic of Ireland	1–0	2–0	UEFA Euro 2024 qualification
4	17 November 2023	Georgios Kamaras Stadium, Athens, Greece	New Zealand	2–0	2–0	Friendly

== Honours ==
AEK Athens

- Super League Greece: 2017–18

Celtic

- Scottish Premiership: 2021–22
- Scottish League Cup: 2021–22

Cruz Azul

- CONCACAF Champions Cup: 2025

Individual

- Eredivisie Player of the Month: January 2021
- Eredivisie top scorer: 2020–21
- Scottish Premiership top scorer: 2021–22 (shared)
- Scottish Premiership Player of the Month: March 2022
- Scottish Cup top scorer: 2021–22
- Best Greek Player playing Abroad: 2020–21
- MLS All-Star: 2023
- MLS Newcomer of the Year: 2023
- MLS Best XI: 2023
- Super League Greece Best Goal: 2025–26 (Matchday 8, Matchday 12),
