= Caleb Wiley =

American soccer player (born 2004)

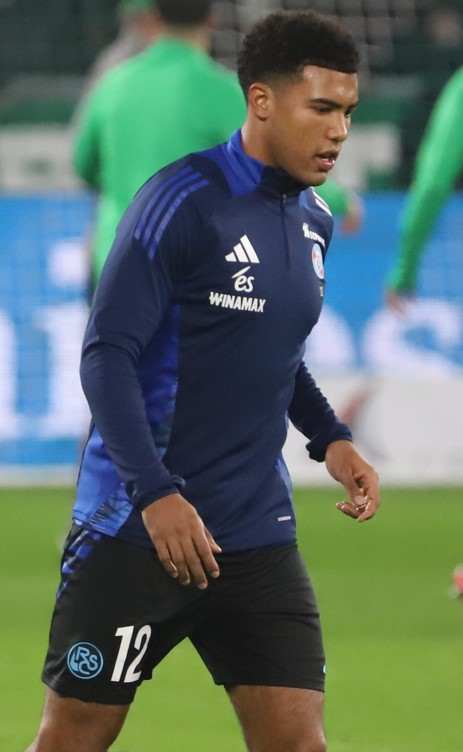
- Wiley with Strasbourg in 2024

Personal information
- Full name: Caleb Ryan Wiley
- Date of birth: December 22, 2004 (age 21)
- Place of birth: Atlanta, Georgia, U.S.
- Height: 5 ft 11 in (1.80 m)
- Position: Left-back

Team information
- Current team: Preston North End (on loan from Chelsea)
- Number: 12

Youth career
- 2016–2022: Atlanta United

Senior career*
Years	Team	Apps	(Gls)
2020–2021	Atlanta United 2	33	(0)
2022–2024	Atlanta United	77	(6)
2024–	Chelsea	0	(0)
2024–2025	→ Strasbourg (loan)	6	(0)
2025–2026	→ Watford (loan)	15	(0)
2026–	→ Preston North End (loan)	3	(1)

International career^{‡}
2020	United States U17	3	(0)
2021–2023	United States U20	10	(1)
2023–	United States U23	8	(0)
2023–2024	United States	3	(0)
- * Club domestic league appearances and goals as of 01:45, 19 September 2026 (UTC) ‡ National team caps and goals as of September 10, 2024

Caleb Ryan Wiley (born December 22, 2004) is an American professional soccer player who plays as a left-back or left wing-back for EFL Championship club Preston North End, on loan from Premier League club Chelsea.

== Club career ==
=== Atlanta United ===
==== Early career ====
Wiley grew up in Atlanta's Morningside neighborhood, playing soccer, football, basketball, and baseball in elementary school before focusing on soccer as he grew older. At 11 years old, Wiley participated in an open tryout for enrollment in Atlanta United's youth academy, and secured one of 30 spots on the fledgling club's U-12 team. Joining the academy just before the professional outfit began their inaugural Major League Soccer season, Wiley remained heavily involved with the club through his debut with Atlanta United 2 in 2020. In 2018, Wiley served as a ball boy as Atlanta defeated the Portland Timbers in the 2018 MLS Cup final.

In July 2020, Wiley made his professional debut with Atlanta's USL Championship affiliate, appearing in a 2–1 defeat to the Tampa Bay Rowdies.

==== Professional ====
On January 18, 2022, Wiley signed a homegrown player contract with Atlanta United. In February, he made his MLS debut against Sporting Kansas City, scoring late in Atlanta's 3–1 victory. With the team suffering from a number of injuries, Wiley found himself moving up the depth chart, finishing the 2022 season with 26 league appearances to his name.

In February 2023, Wiley was named amongst American Soccer Now's top 20 young Americans to watch during the 2023 Major League Soccer season. It didn't take Wiley long to live up to those expectations, scoring twice and providing an additional assist in Atlanta's week three victory over Charlotte FC. At 18 years and 79 days of age, he became the fifth-youngest player in league history to contribute to three goals in a single game. As a result of that performance, he was named to the league's Team of the Matchday for week three and was named Player of the Week. He added his third goal of the season the following week in a 5–1 victory over Portland. Wiley concluded the season with four goals in 33 MLS appearances, as Atlanta were eliminated from the playoffs by eventual champions Columbus. Wiley was believed to have a high upside, but remained "an incomplete attacking player" as well as "a flawed defensive one" according to analysts from The Athletic, owing to lapses in his defensive decision-making and awareness.

=== Chelsea ===
On July 22, 2024, Premier League club Chelsea announced the signing of Wiley on a six-year contract, paying a transfer fee of approximately £8.5 million.

==== Loan to Strasbourg ====
On August 11, 2024, Wiley was loaned out to BlueCo-owned Ligue 1 club Strasbourg on a season-long deal. He made his competitive debut on August 18, 2024, in Strasbourg's 1–1 draw with Montpellier.

==== Loan to Watford ====
On February 3, 2025, Wiley was recalled from his loan at Strasbourg and joined EFL Championship club Watford on loan. On July 22, 2025, Watford extended his loan for one more season. However, the loan was terminated on January 9, 2026.

==== Loan to Preston North End ====
On August 28, 2026, Wiley joined EFL Championship club Preston North End on loan for a season. On 1 September 2026, he scored his first goal on his debut for the club, a 3–1 defeat to Bristol City.

== International career ==
In early 2020, Wiley, alongside Atlanta United Academy teammate Efrain Morales, was called up to the United States U17 squad for a UEFA Development Tournament taking place in England. He made his youth international debut on February 19, 2020, playing the entirety of a 2–1 defeat to Spain. In November 2021, at just 16 years of age, he was called up to the United States U20 roster.

On April 12, 2023, Wiley received his first called up to the USMNT. Seven days later, he made his senior national team debut in a 1–1 draw in a friendly against Mexico.

On October 8, Wiley was called up to the United States under-23 national team ahead of friendlies against Mexico and Japan. In July 2024, he was called up to the United States under-23 national team to compete in 2024 Summer Olympics.

== Player profile ==
=== Style of play ===
Wiley is known for his pace, crossing, and ability to contribute both offensively and defensively, marking him as a versatile option in the fullback position. He has additionally been utilized as a wingback and a winger during his professional career.

== Career statistics ==
=== Club ===
As of match played September 1, 2026

Appearances and goals by club, season and competition
Club	Season	League			National cup (Note: Includes U.S. Open Cup)		Continental		Other		Total	
Club	Season	Division	Apps	Goals	Apps	Goals	Apps	Goals	Apps	Goals	Apps	Goals
Atlanta United 2	2020	USL	11	0	—		—		—		11	0
Atlanta United 2	2021	USL	22	0	—		—		—		22	0
Atlanta United 2	Total		33	0	—		—		—		33	0
Atlanta United	2022	MLS	26	1	—		—		—		26	1
Atlanta United	2023	MLS	30	4	1	0	2 (Note: Appearances in Leagues Cup)	0	3 (Note: Appearances in MLS Cup Playoffs)	0	36	4
Atlanta United	2024	MLS	21	1	—		—		—		21	1
Atlanta United	Total		77	6	1	0	2	0	3	0	83	6
Chelsea	2024–25	Premier League	—		—		—		—		—	
Strasbourg (loan)	2024–25	Ligue 1	6	0	—		—		—		6	0
Watford (loan)	2024–25	Championship	10	0	—		—		—		10	0
Watford (loan)	2025–26	Championship	5	0	0	0	—		—		5	0
Watford (loan)	Total		15	0	0	0	—		—		15	0
Preston North End (loan)	2026–27	Championship	2	1	0	0	—		0	0	2	1
Career total			133	7	1	0	2	0	3	0	139	7

=== International ===
As of match played September 10, 2024

Appearances and goals by national team and year
National team	Year	Apps	Goals
United States	2023	1	0
United States	2024	2	0
Total		3	0
