= Stian Gregersen =

Norwegian footballer (born 1995)

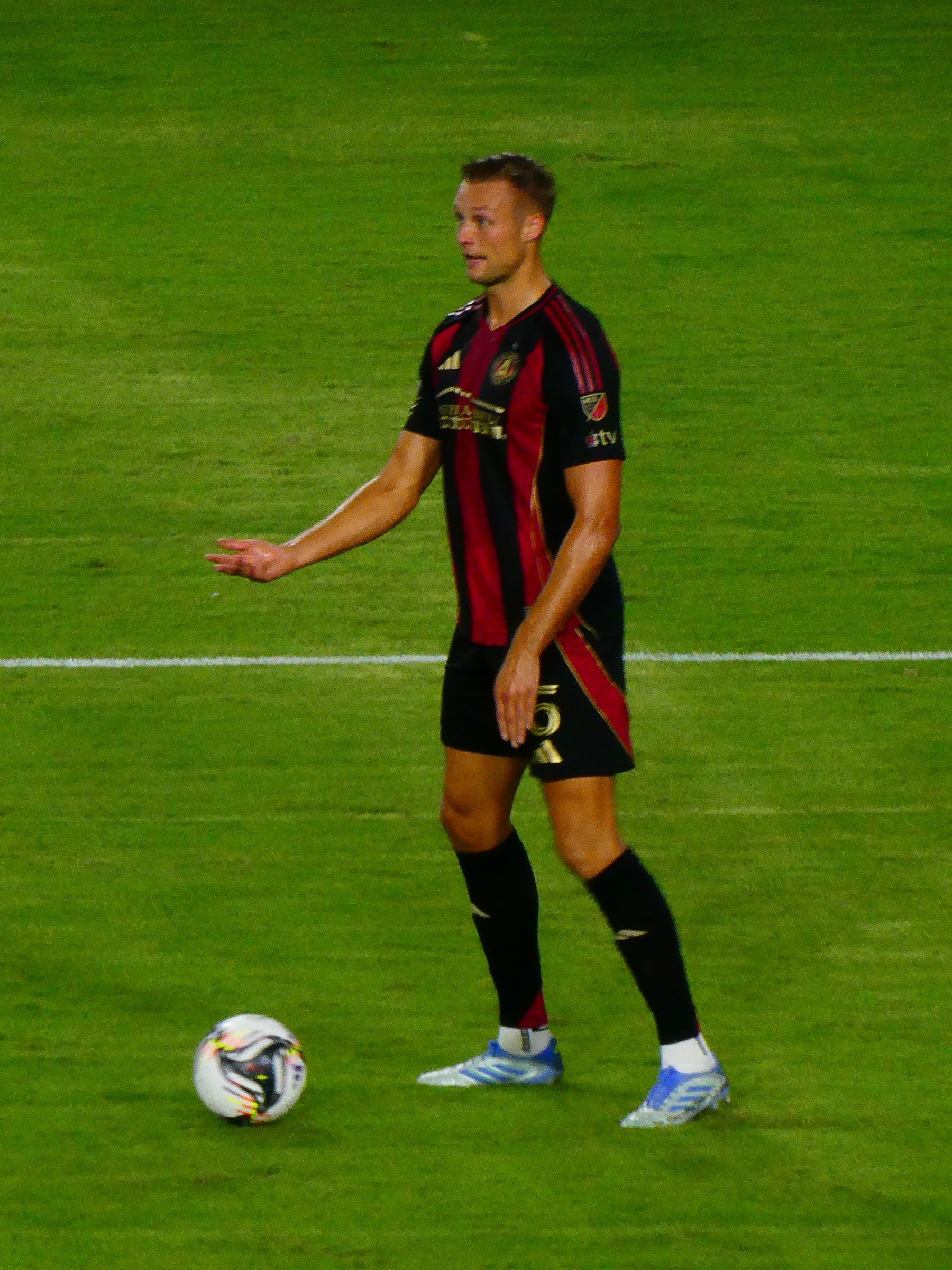
- Stian Gregersen with Atlanta United

Personal information
- Full name: Stian Rode Gregersen
- Date of birth: 17 May 1995 (age 31)
- Place of birth: Kristiansund, Norway
- Height: 1.92 m (6 ft 4 in)
- Position: Central defender

Team information
- Current team: Malmö FF
- Number: 2

Youth career
- Kristiansund
- –2012: Clausenengen

Senior career*
Years	Team	Apps	(Gls)
2012–2021	Molde	74	(4)
2012	→ Kristiansund (loan)	5	(1)
2015	→ Kristiansund (loan)	24	(1)
2019	→ Elfsborg (loan)	26	(1)
2021–2024	Bordeaux	73	(2)
2024–2026	Atlanta United	56	(2)
2026–	Malmö FF	4	(0)

International career^{‡}
2013	Norway U18	2	(0)
2021–	Norway	11	(0)
- * Club domestic league appearances and goals as of 19 September 2026 ‡ National team caps and goals as of 26 March 2025

Stian Rode Gregersen (born 17 May 1995) is a Norwegian professional footballer who plays as a centre back for Allsvenskan club Malmö and the Norway national team.

== Club career ==
Nicknamed the tall mountain troll due to his height, Gregersen was brought to Molde from Clausenengen in 2012. In March 2015, Gregersen joined Kristiansund on loan for the 2015 season.

On 16 February 2017, Gregersen signed a new contract with Molde, which would have kept him with the club until 2020.

In February 2019, Gregersen joined Elfsborg on loan until the end of the 2019 season.

On 31 August 2021, Gregersen left Molde to sign for Bordeaux.

Gregersen joined Atlanta United of Major League Soccer on 11 January 2024.

== International career ==
Gregersen made his debut for the Norway national team on 27 March 2021 in a World Cup qualifier against Turkey.

== Career statistics ==
=== Club ===
As of match played 19 September 2026

Appearances and goals by club, season and competition
Club	Season	League			National cup (Note: Inclues Norwegian Cup, Coupe de France, U.S. Open Cup)		Continental		Other		Total	
Club	Season	Division	Apps	Goals	Apps	Goals	Apps	Goals	Apps	Goals	Apps	Goals
Molde	2012	Eliteserien	0	0	0	0	0	0	—		0	0
Molde	2013	Eliteserien	0	0	0	0	0	0	—		0	0
Molde	2014	Eliteserien	0	0	0	0	0	0	—		0	0
Molde	2015	Eliteserien	0	0	0	0	0	0	—		0	0
Molde	2016	Eliteserien	7	0	0	0	0	0	—		7	0
Molde	2017	Eliteserien	27	1	2	0	—		—		29	1
Molde	2018	Eliteserien	14	0	1	0	5 (Note: Appearances in UEFA Europa League)	0	—		20	0
Molde	2020	Eliteserien	12	2	0	0	12 (Note: Three appearances in UEFA Champions League, nine appearances in UEFA Europa League)	0	—		24	2
Molde	2021	Eliteserien	14	1	1	0	3 (Note: Appearances in UEFA Europa Conference League)	0	—		18	1
Molde	Total		74	4	4	0	20	0	—		98	4
Kristiansund (loan)	2012	2. divisjon	5	1	2	0	—		—		7	1
Kristiansund (loan)	2015	OBOS-ligaen	24	1	4	0	—		—		28	1
Kristiansund (loan)	Total		29	2	6	0	—		—		35	2
Elfsborg (loan)	2019	Allsvenskan	26	1	0	0	—		—		26	1
Bordeaux	2021–22	Ligue 1	24	1	0	0	—		—		24	1
Bordeaux	2022–23	Ligue 2	36	1	1	0	—		—		37	1
Bordeaux	2023–24	Ligue 2	13	0	1	0	—		—		14	0
Bordeaux	Total		73	2	2	0	—		—		75	2
Atlanta United FC	2024	Major League Soccer	23	2	3	0	—		6 (Note: Two appearances in Leagues Cup, four appearances and one goal in MLS Cup playoffs)	1	32	3
Atlanta United FC	2025	Major League Soccer	18	0	0	0	—		3 (Note: Appearances in Leagues Cup)	0	21	0
Atlanta United FC	2026	Major League Soccer	15	0	0	0	—		0	0	15	0
Atlanta United FC	Total		56	2	3	0	—		9	1	68	3
Malmö	2026	Allsvenskan	4	0	0	0	—		—		4	0
Career total			262	11	15	0	20	0	9	1	306	12

=== International ===
As of match played 25 March 2025

Appearances and goals by national team and year
National team	Year	Apps	Goals
Norway	2021	5	0
Norway	2022	2	0
Norway	2023	1	0
Norway	2024	2	0
Norway	2025	1	0
Total		11	0

== Honours ==
Molde

- Tippeligaen: 2014
