= Juanjo Purata =

Mexican footballer (born 1998)

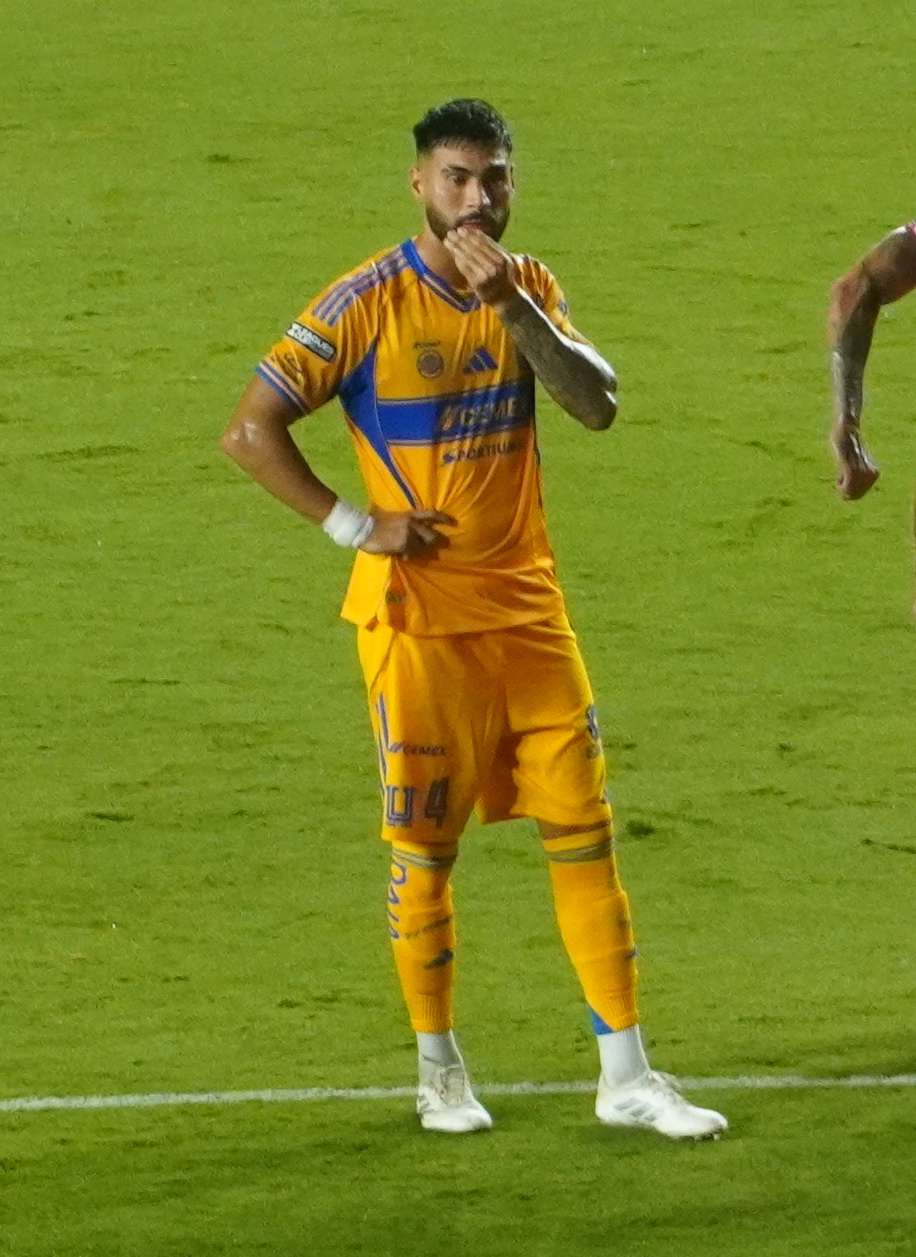
- Sánchez Purata with Tigres UANL in 2025

Personal information
- Full name: Juan José Sánchez Purata
- Date of birth: 9 January 1998 (age 28)
- Place of birth: San Luis Potosí, Mexico
- Height: 1.86 m (6 ft 1 in)
- Position: Centre-back

Team information
- Current team: Atlas (on loan from Tigres UANL)
- Number: 44

Senior career*
Years	Team	Apps	(Gls)
2017–	Tigres UANL	76	(0)
2022–2023	→ Atlanta United (loan)	46	(7)
2026–	→ Atlas (loan)	11	(1)

International career^{‡}
2025–	Mexico	1	(0)
- * Club domestic league appearances and goals as of 20 November 2026 ‡ National team caps and goals as of 9 September 2025

Juan José Sánchez Purata (born 9 January 1998) is a Mexican professional footballer who plays as a centre-back for Liga MX club Atlas, on loan from Tigres UANL and also for the Mexico national team.

== Career statistics ==
=== Club ===
As of match played on 20 November 2026

Club	Season	League			Cup (Note: Includes Copa MX, U.S. Open Cup, 2024 Supercopa de la Liga MX)		Continental		Other		Total	
Club	Season	Division	Apps	Goals	Apps	Goals	Apps	Goals	Apps	Goals	Apps	Goals
Tigres UANL	2017–18	Liga MX	—		1	0	—		—		1	0
Tigres UANL	2018–19	Liga MX	4	0	6	0	—		—		10	0
Tigres UANL	2019–20	Liga MX	3	0	—		1 (Note: Appearances in CONCACAF Champions Cup)	1	—		4	1
Tigres UANL	2020–21	Liga MX	6	0	—		—		—		6	0
Tigres UANL	2021–22	Liga MX	13	0	—		—		—		13	0
Tigres UANL	2023–24	Liga MX	10	0	1	0	3	0	—		14	0
Tigres UANL	2024–25	Liga MX	16	0	—		7	1	1 (Note: Appearances in Leagues Cup)	0	24	1
Tigres UANL	2025–26	Liga MX	24	0	—		5	0	4	0	33	0
Tigres UANL	Total		76	0	8	0	16	2	5	0	105	2
Atlanta United (loan)	2022	MLS	17	6	—		—		—		17	6
Atlanta United (loan)	2023	MLS	29	1	1	0	—		2	0	32	1
Atlanta United (loan)	Total		46	7	1	0	—		2	0	49	7
Atlas (loan)	2026–27	Liga MX	11	1	—		—		3	0	14	1
Career total			133	8	9	0	16	2	10	0	168	10

=== International ===
As of match played on 9 September 2025

Appearances and goals by national team and year
National team	Year	Apps	Goals
Mexico	2025	1	0
Total		1	0

== Honours ==
Tigres UANL

- Campeones Cup: 2018
- CONCACAF Champions League: 2020
