= Noah Cobb =

American soccer player (born 2005)

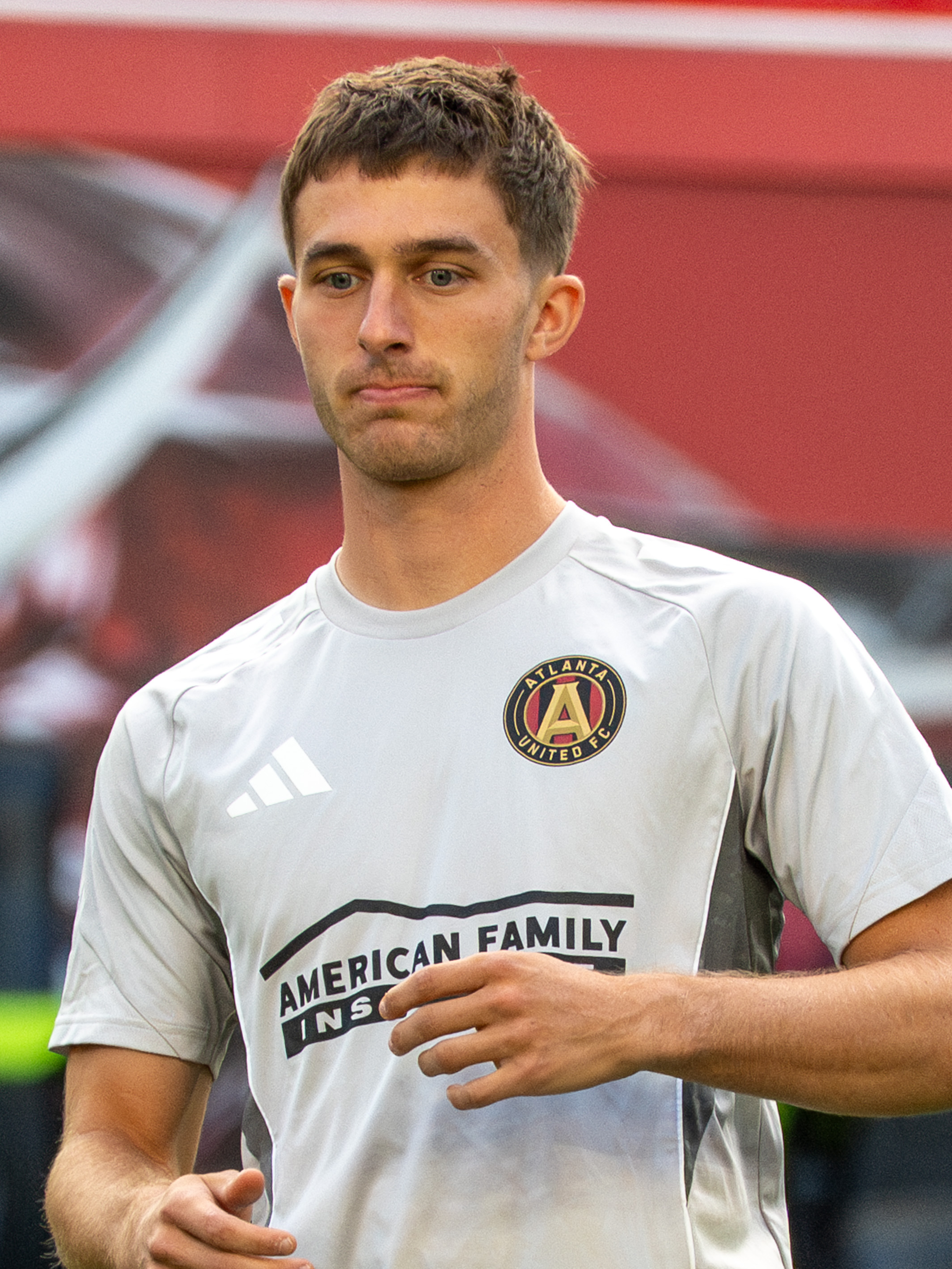
- Cobb with Atlanta United in 2025

Personal information
- Date of birth: July 20, 2005 (age 21)
- Place of birth: Chattanooga, Tennessee, US
- Height: 6 ft 0 in (1.83 m)
- Position: Center-back

Team information
- Current team: Colorado Rapids
- Number: 24

Youth career
- –2016: Chattanooga FC
- 2016–2022: Atlanta United

Senior career*
Years	Team	Apps	(Gls)
2021–2025	Atlanta United 2	61	(3)
2022–2025	Atlanta United	35	(0)
2025	→ Colorado Rapids (loan)	4	(0)
2026–	Colorado Rapids	9	(0)

International career^{‡}
2024–2025	United States U20	14	(1)
2025–	United States U23	1	(0)
Medal record
Men's football
Representing United States
CONCACAF U-20 Championship
Runner-up	2024 Mexico
- * Club domestic league appearances and goals as of 16:49, August 1, 2025 (EST) ‡ National team caps and goals as of November 18, 2025

Noah Cobb (born July 20, 2005) is an American professional soccer player who plays as a center-back for Major League Soccer club Colorado Rapids.

== Club career ==
Born in Chattanooga, Tennessee, Cobb played club soccer with Chattanooga FC aka CFC, before joining the Atlanta United academy team's under-12 side. Cobb progressed through the academy, also appearing for the club's USL Championship side Atlanta United 2 eleven times during their 2021 season.

On March 23, 2022, Cobb signed a full professional contract with Atlanta United 2. In 2023, Cobb became an Atlanta United player on a homegrown player deal.

On July 25, 2025, the Colorado Rapids signed Cobb on loan for the remainder of the 2025 season. Later, the Rapids would opt to fully acquire Cobb in exchange for $525,000 in general allocation money on December 9.
