= Edwin Mosquera (footballer) =

Colombian footballer (born 2001)

Personal information
- Full name: Edwin Stiven Mosquera Palacios
- Date of birth: 27 June 2001 (age 25)
- Place of birth: Quibdó, Colombia
- Height: 1.69 m (5 ft 7 in)
- Position: Left winger

Team information
- Current team: Santa Fe

Youth career
- –2019: Independiente Medellín

Senior career*
Years	Team	Apps	(Gls)
2019–2022	Independiente Medellín	34	(0)
2021	→ Juventude (loan)	1	(0)
2022	→ Aldosivi (loan)	14	(1)
2022–2025	Atlanta United	56	(5)
2023	→ Defensa y Justicia (loan)	5	(0)
2024	→ Atlanta United 2 (loan)	1	(0)
2025	→ Millonarios (loan)	15	(0)
2026–	Santa Fe	0	(0)

International career^{‡}
2020	Colombia U20	2	(1)
- * Club domestic league appearances and goals as of 18 January 2026 ‡ National team caps and goals as of 12 July 2022

Edwin Stiven Mosquera Palacios (born 27 June 2001) is a Colombian professional footballer who plays as a left winger for Categoría Primera A club Santa Fe.

== Career ==
=== Atlanta United ===
On 12 July 2022, Mosquera signed a four-year deal with Major League Soccer club Atlanta United for an undisclosed transfer fee.
