= Machop Chol =

South Sudanese footballer

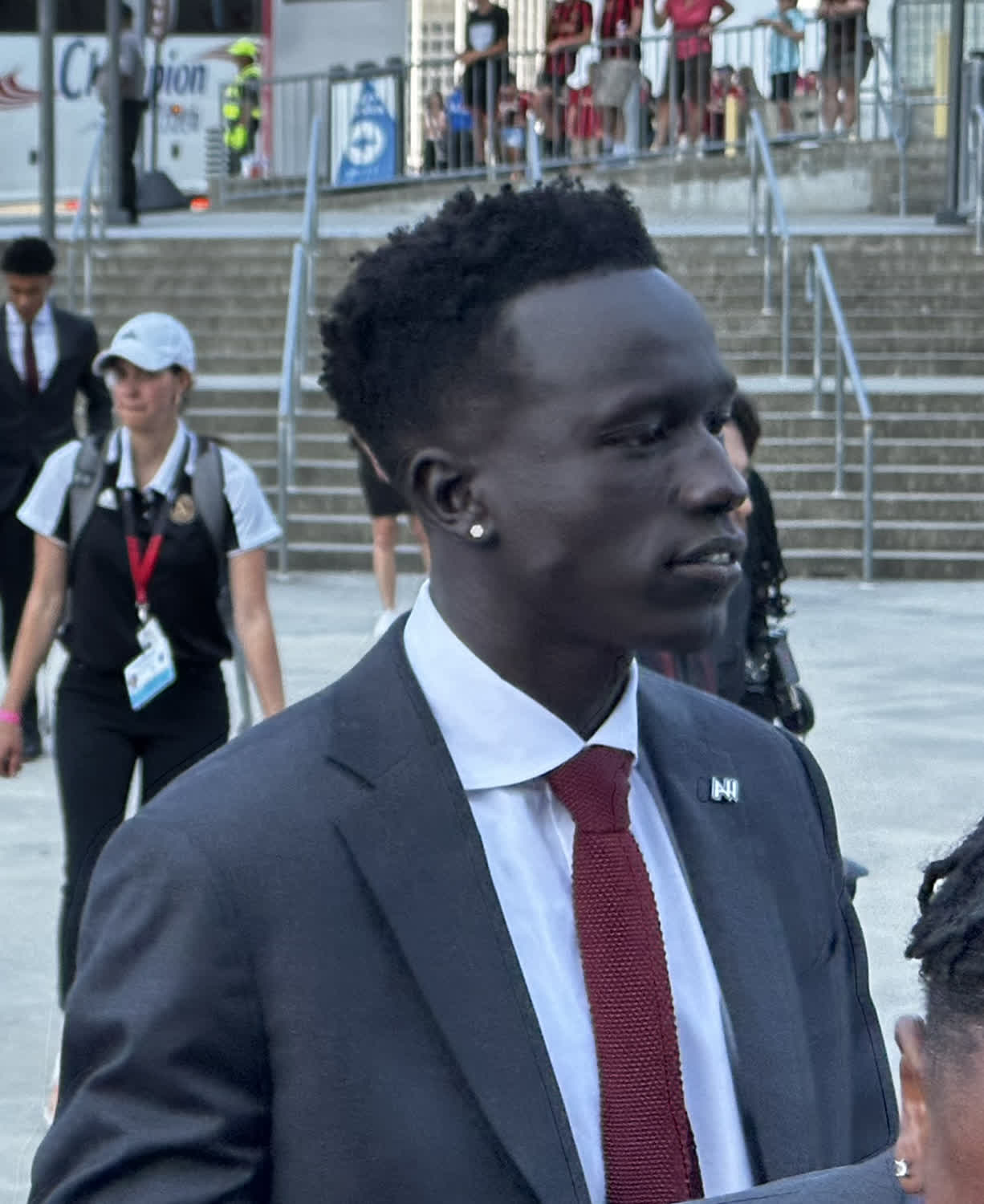
- Chol in 2023

Personal information
- Full name: Machop Malual Chol
- Date of birth: 14 November 1998 (age 28)
- Place of birth: Khartoum, Sudan
- Height: 6 ft 2 in (1.88 m)
- Position: Forward

Team information
- Current team: Ansan Greeners
- Number: 9

Youth career
- DDYSC Wolves
- 2016–2017: Atlanta United

College career
Years	Team	Apps	(Gls)
2017–2020	Wake Forest Demon Deacons	65	(13)

Senior career*
Years	Team	Apps	(Gls)
2021–2023	Atlanta United	34	(2)
2021–2023	Atlanta United 2	8	(2)
2024	San Antonio FC	22	(2)
2025–2026	FK Žalgiris	22	(3)
2026–	Ansan Greeners	10	(2)

International career^{‡}
2022–	South Sudan	4	(0)
- * Club domestic league appearances and goals as of 08:12, 19 May 2026 (UTC) ‡ National team caps and goals as of 10:55, 11 March 2026 (UTC)

Machop Malual Chol (born 14 November 1998) is a professional footballer who plays as a forward for Ansan Greeners in the K League 2. Born in Sudan and raised in the United States, he plays for the South Sudan national team.

== Club career ==
Born in Khartoum on 14 November 1998, Chol immigrated with his family to the United States in 2000. His family settled in Clarkston, Georgia, where he first learned to play soccer. He began his career playing with youth club DDYSC Wolves before earning a spot in the Atlanta United academy in 2016.

In August 2017, Chol began playing college soccer for the Wake Forest Demon Deacons. He made his debut for the Demon Deacons on 25 August against the Rutgers Scarlet Knights where he scored his first goal. Throughout his time at Wake Forest, Chol scored 13 goals in 65 matches.

=== Atlanta United ===
On 19 January 2021, Chol signed a homegrown player contract with Major League Soccer club Atlanta United. He made his professional debut on 17 April against Orlando City, coming on as a substitute. His first MLS goal for Atlanta United was scored on 16 April 2023 at Toronto FC.

=== San Antonio FC ===
Following his release from Atlanta at the end of the 2023 season, Chol signed with USL Championship side San Antonio FC on 2 April 2024.

=== FK Žalgiris ===
On 6 March 2025 Žalgiris Club announced about new player.

On 29 January 2026 it was announced that Chol had left Žalgiris.

=== Ansan Greeners ===
On 2 February 2026, Chol moved to K League 2 side Ansan Greeners.

== International career ==
Chol made his international debut for South Sudan on 27 January 2022 in a friendly defeat to Uzbekistan.

== Career statistics ==
=== Club ===
As of match played 9 November 2021

Appearances and goals by club, season and competition
Club	Season	League			Cup		Continental		Total	
Club	Season	Division	Apps	Goals	Apps	Goals	Apps	Goals	Apps	Goals
Atlanta United	2021	Major League Soccer	9	1	0	0	0	0	10	0
Career total			9	1	0	0	0	0	10	0

=== International ===
As of match played 27 January 2022

National team	Year	Apps	Goals
South Sudan	2022	1	0
Total		1	0
