= List of Atlanta United FC players =

This list comprises all players who have participated in at least one league match for the Atlanta United FC since the team's first Major League Soccer season in 2017. Players who were on the roster but never appeared in a regular season game are not listed.

== Players ==
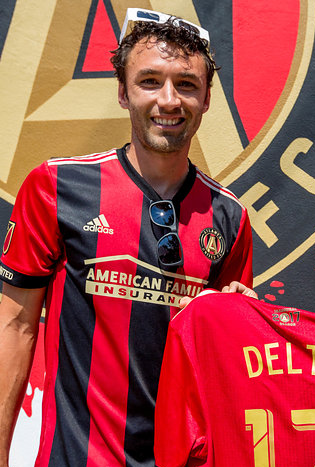
Michael Parkhurst was the first captain of the team.

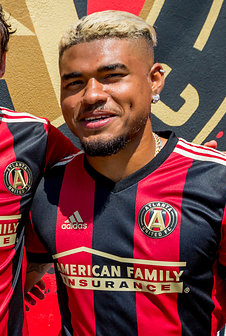
Josef Martínez is the team's top scorer.

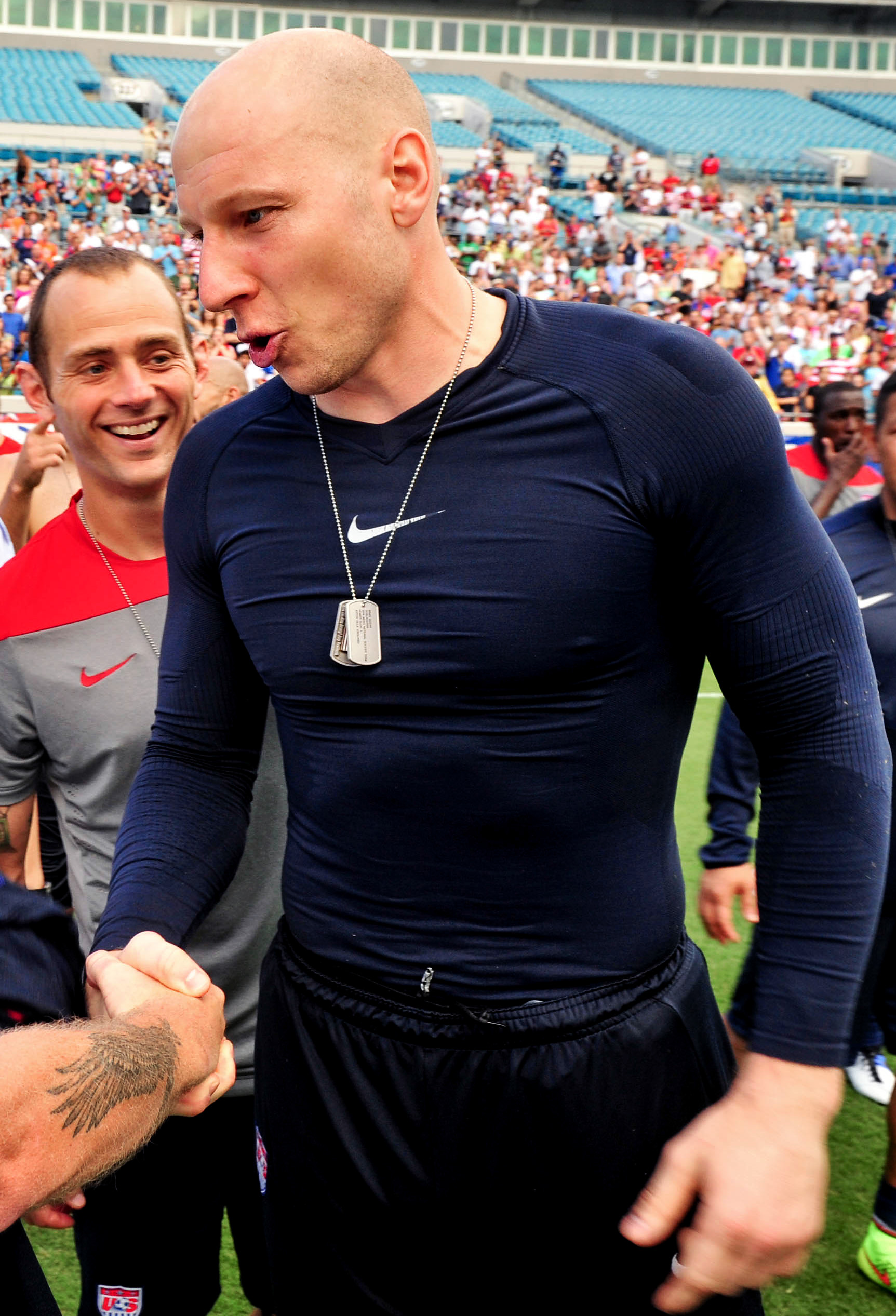
Brad Guzan has the most appearances as a goalkeeper for Atlanta United FC.

As of April 8, 2021

Name	Position	Nationality	Years	Games	Goals	Assists	Source
Mo Adams	MF	England	2019–	17	1	1	
Miguel Almirón	MF	Paraguay	2017–2018	62	21	28	
Mikey Ambrose	DF	United States	2017–2019	20	0	2	
Yamil Asad	MF	Argentina	2017	32	7	13	
Ezequiel Barco	MF	Argentina	2018–2021	81	17	9	
George Bello	DF	United States	2018–2021	52	3	1	
Mark Bloom	DF	United States	2017	2	0	0	
Bobby Boswell	DF	United States	2017	1	0	0	
George Campbell	DF	United States	2020–	1	0	0	
Andrew Carleton	MF	United States	2017–2020	11	0	1	
Carlos Carmona	MF	Chile	2017	31	2	2	
Edgar Castillo	DF	United States	2020	4	0	0	
Manuel Castro	FW	Uruguay	2020	10	0	0	
Jurgen Damm	MF	Mexico	2020–2021	24	0	4	
Franco Escobar	DF	Argentina	2018–2020	64	2	5	
Jon Gallagher	FW	Ireland	2018–2020	16	4	0	
Greg Garza	DF	United States	2017–2018	37	3	8	
Leandro González Pírez	DF	Argentina	2017–2019	95	3	6	
Julian Gressel	MF	Germany	2017–2019	98	15	35	
Harrison Heath	MF	England	2017	1	0	0	
José Hernández	DF	Venezuela	2018–2019	1	0	0	
Emerson Hyndman	MF	United States	2019–2022	35	3	5	
Adam Jahn	FW	United States	2020	21	3	2	
Kenwyne Jones	FW	Trinidad and Tobago	2017	17	2	0	
Kevin Kratz	MF	Germany	2017–2019	48	3	2	
Jeff Larentowicz	MF, DF	United States	2017–2020	113	4	5	
Brooks Lennon	MF	United States	2020–	23	2	3	
Josef Martínez	FW	Venezuela	2017–	84	77	11	
Pity Martínez	FW	Argentina	2019–2020	39	7	11	
Chris McCann	MF, DF	Ireland	2017–2018	45	1	2	
Tyrone Mears	DF	England	2017	20	1	1	
Justin Meram	MF	Iraq	2019	20	4	0	
Fernando Meza	DF	Argentina	2020	13	0	0	
Marcelino Moreno	MF	Argentina	2020–	6	2	1	
Jake Mulraney	MF	Ireland	2020–	18	1	1	
Darlington Nagbe	MF	United States	2018–2019	56	2	7	
Michael Parkhurst	DF	United States	2017–2019	86	0	2	
Dion Pereira	FW, MF	England	2019	18	0	1	
Jacob Peterson	MF	United States	2017	10	3	0	
Florentin Pogba	DF	Guinea	2019	16	0	0	
Eric Remedi	MF	Argentina	2018–2020	59	1	3	
Miles Robinson	DF	United States	2017–	61	0	0	
Matheus Rossetto	MF	Brazil	2020–	15	0	0	
Brek Shea	DF	United States	2019	19	0	1	
Erick Torres	FW	Mexico	2020–	13	1	1	
Brandon Vazquez	FW	United States	2017–2019	32	3	2	
Héctor Villalba	FW, MF	Paraguay	2017–2019	82	21	24	
Anton Walkes	DF	England	2017, 2020–	37	2	1	
Andrew Wheeler-Omiunu	MF	United States	2017–2018	1	0	0	
JJ Williams	FW	United States	2020	1	0	0	
Romario Williams	FW	Jamaica	2017–2019	19	1	0	
Tyler Wolff	MF	United States	2020–	5	0	0	
Laurence Wyke	DF	England	2020	7	0	0	
Sal Zizzo	MF, DF	United States	2018	6	0	0	

=== Goalkeepers ===
Name	Nationality	Years	Games	Conceded	Clean Sheets	Source
Paul Christensen	United States	2018	1	2	0	
Brad Guzan	United States	2017–	140	124	36	
Alec Kann	United States	2017–2021	24	26	4	
Kyle Reynish	United States	2017	2	3	0	
Alexandros Tabakis	Greece	2017	1	2	0	
