= 2019 U.S. Open Cup final =

2019 final of the Lamar Hunt U.S. Open Cup

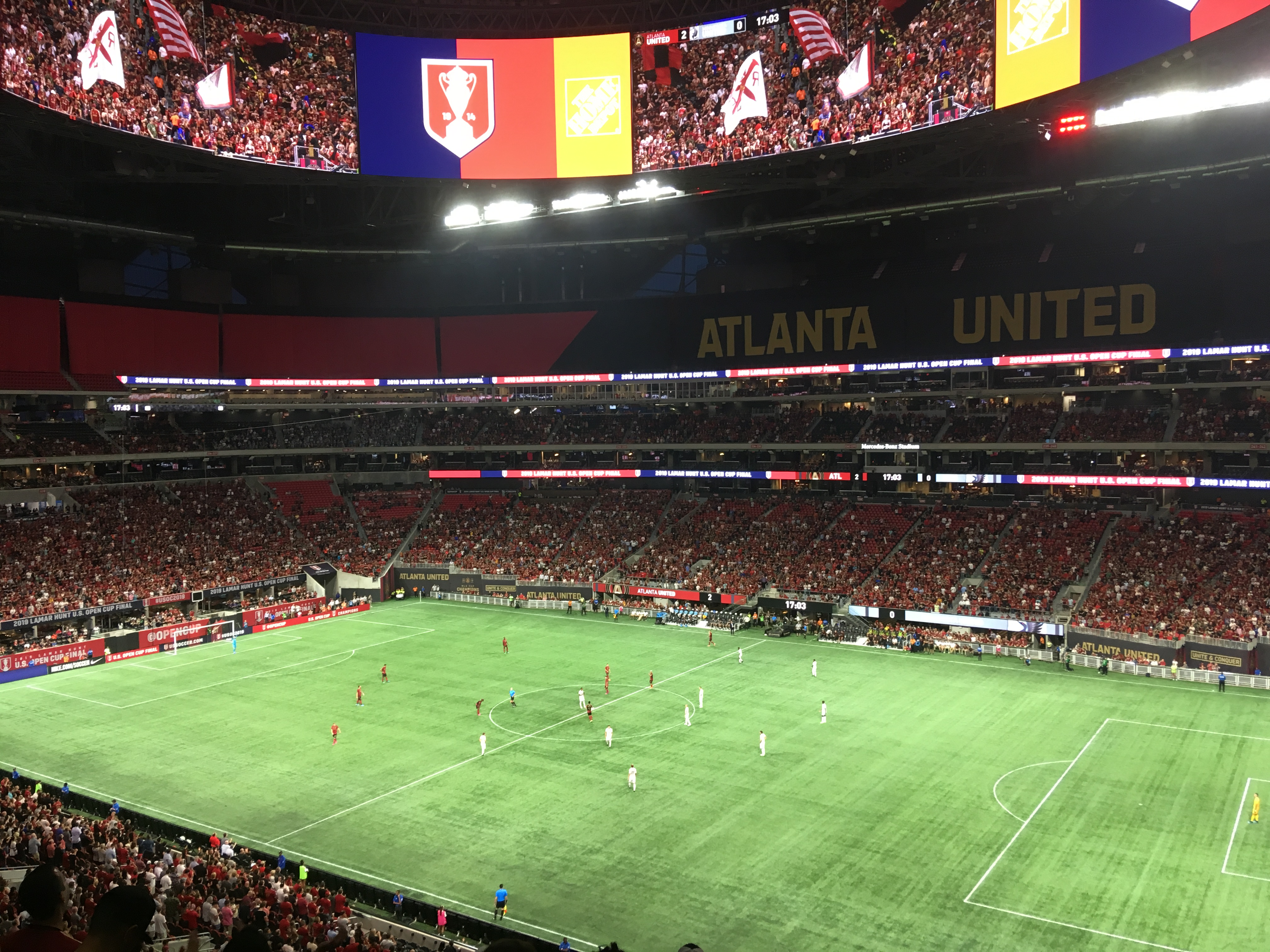
- Event: 2019 U.S. Open Cup
Atlanta United FC	Minnesota United FC
MLS	MLS
2	1
- Date: August 27, 2019
- Venue: Mercedes-Benz Stadium, Atlanta, Georgia
- Man of the Match: Leandro González Pírez (Atlanta United)
- Referee: Allen Chapman
- Attendance: 35,709

The 2019 Lamar Hunt U.S. Open Cup final was a soccer match that was played on August 27, 2019, at Mercedes-Benz Stadium in Atlanta, Georgia, United States. It determined the winner of the 2019 U.S. Open Cup, the 106th edition of the oldest competition in U.S. soccer, which was open to amateur and professional soccer teams affiliated with the United States Soccer Federation. The match was contested by two Major League Soccer teams making their debuts in the final: hosts Atlanta United FC, in their first Open Cup final, and Minnesota United FC; both teams entered MLS as expansion teams during the 2017 season.

Atlanta won the match 2–1, taking their second major trophy and qualifying for the 2020 CONCACAF Champions League. A total of 35,709 spectators watched the final, which set a new U.S. Open Cup attendance record. The match was broadcast in English on online streaming service ESPN+. Atlanta was given first priority to host the match if they advanced, based on a random draw conducted by the United States Soccer Federation.

== Road to the final ==
The U.S. Open Cup is an annual soccer competition open to adult teams in the United States that are affiliated with the United States Soccer Federation. Its 84 participants include professional and amateur teams, with the exception of reserve and academy teams that are directly owned and operated by Major League Soccer (MLS) clubs. The 2019 tournament was the 106th edition of the U.S. Open Cup, the oldest ongoing soccer tournament in the United States. The 21 eligible MLS teams entered in the fourth round, facing teams from the USL Championship and National Premier Soccer League.

The finalists, Atlanta United FC and Minnesota United FC, both play in MLS and entered the league during the 2017 season as expansion teams. Both teams represented states that had never sent a team to a U.S. Open Cup final. Their most recent meeting, played in May at Mercedes-Benz Stadium, ended in a 3–0 victory for Atlanta.

=== Atlanta United FC ===
Round	Opponent	Score
4th	Charleston Battery (H)	3–1 (a.e.t.)
R16	Columbus Crew SC (A)	3–2
QF	Saint Louis FC (H)	2–0
SF	Orlando City SC (A)	2–0
Key: (H) = Home; (A) = Away

Atlanta United FC, the defending MLS Cup champions, were eliminated by the Chicago Fire in the Round of 16 during the previous edition of the U.S. Open Cup. The match was played at Mercedes-Benz Stadium in Atlanta and set a new attendance record for the competition, with 41,012 spectators. They were scheduled to play their first match of the 2019 tournament on June 11 against the Charleston Battery in Charleston, South Carolina, but field conditions caused by heavy rain forced it to be moved to Fifth Third Bank Stadium in Kennesaw, Georgia. The match was played behind closed doors on June 13 and ended in a 3–1 victory for Atlanta United. The hosts fell behind in the 20th minute to a goal by Charleston's Ian Svantesson, but equalized through Romario Williams in the 79th minute. In extra time, substitute striker Brandon Vazquez scored twice to earn his team a place in the Round of 16.

Atlanta played away to the Columbus Crew in the Round of 16 after being drawn into the Mideast regional bracket. Atlanta took a 2–0 lead in the opening fourteen minutes, with Vazquez scoring his third goal of the tournament and defender Miles Robinson scored his first professional goal. David Accam scored for Columbus before halftime, but Vazquez added a third goal for Atlanta in the 65th minute to maintain the two-goal lead. Six minutes later, a cross from the Crew's Waylon Francis was deflected by Atlanta goalkeeper Brad Guzan into his own net for an own goal. After an hour-long rain delay, Atlanta United held on to win 3–2 and advance to the quarterfinals. Atlanta fielded most of its first team in the quarterfinals against Saint Louis FC, a USL team that had eliminated two MLS teams in prior rounds of the tournament. Atlanta outshot Saint Louis 21–11 and had the majority of possession, but were unable to score in the first half. The scoreless match was broken in the 53rd minute, when Pity Martínez scored from within the penalty area. A penalty kick, awarded to Atlanta during stoppage time after a foul on Dion Pereira, was converted by Josef Martínez to end the match with a 2–0 victory.

In its semifinal fixture against Orlando City SC, Atlanta took the lead in the 37th minute through a goal by Eric Remedi after his initial shot was saved by goalkeeper Adam Grinwis. After two chances to equalize were missed by Orlando, Atlanta's Emerson Hyndman scored his first goal for the club, giving the visitors a 2–0 win and their first berth to the U.S. Open Cup final.

=== Minnesota United FC ===
Round	Opponent	Score
4th	Sporting Kansas City (H)	4–1
R16	Houston Dynamo (A)	3–2
QF	New Mexico United (H)	6–1
SF	Portland Timbers (H)	2–1
Key: (H) = Home; (A) = Away

Minnesota United FC, nicknamed the Loons, began their U.S. Open Cup campaign in the fourth round with a match against Sporting Kansas City at their home stadium, Allianz Field. Minnesota took the lead in the second minute through a goal by Ángelo Rodríguez, but Kansas City's Gerso Fernandes scored an equalizer in the 27th minute to keep the teams level at halftime. In the first 20 minutes of the second half, Minnesota scored three goals to clinch their place in the Round of 16, including a brace by Darwin Quintero.

In the Round of 16, the Loons played away to the defending U.S. Open Cup champions, the Houston Dynamo. The fixture was a rematch of the 2018 U.S. Open Cup's Round of 16, in which Houston eliminated Minnesota. The Dynamo took a 2–0 lead in the first half with goals by Ronaldo Peña and Tomás Martínez. Quintero scored another brace to equalize for Minnesota, with goals in the 66th minute and in the 82nd minute from long range. Substitute forward Mason Toye scored on a tap-in in the 89th minute to complete a 3–2 comeback victory for Minnesota United as they advanced to the U.S. Open Cup quarterfinals for the first time in club history.

In the quarterfinals, Minnesota United hosted USL side New Mexico United, who had defeated two MLS teams in earlier rounds and arranged a special charter flight for 400 of their fans to attend the match at Allianz Field. Santi Moar scored the opening goal for New Mexico in the seventh minute, but the Loons responded with five goals before halftime and an additional goal in the second half. The equalizer for Minnesota was scored in the tenth minute by Ángelo Rodríguez, who went on to earn a first-half hat-trick to add to goals by teammates Darwin Quintero and Ján Greguš; Miguel Ibarra was the lone goalscorer in the second half, finishing his first home goal of the season in the 62nd minute.

Minnesota hosted the Portland Timbers in the semifinals in a rematch of an MLS fixture three days earlier at Allianz Field that ended in a 1–0 victory for the hosts. The Loons took the lead in the 22nd minute with Darwin Qunitero's penalty, which was awarded after a free kick struck defender Claude Dielna's hand. Portland's Brian Fernández equalized for his side in first half stoppage time with a close-range shot, but Minnesota retook the lead in the 64th minute through a goal by Mason Toye, who finished a long run with a shot from inside the box. Portland missed a chance to equalize in stoppage time after a shot by Sebastian Blanco bounced off goalkeeper Vito Mannone and hit the post before heading wide, giving the Loons a 2–1 victory. Minnesota midfielder Osvaldo Alonso advanced to his seventh Open Cup final, having played for the Charleston Battery in the 2008 final and the Seattle Sounders FC in five finals from 2009 to 2014. The match would also be the first competition final for Minnesota United since they entered MLS.

== Venue ==
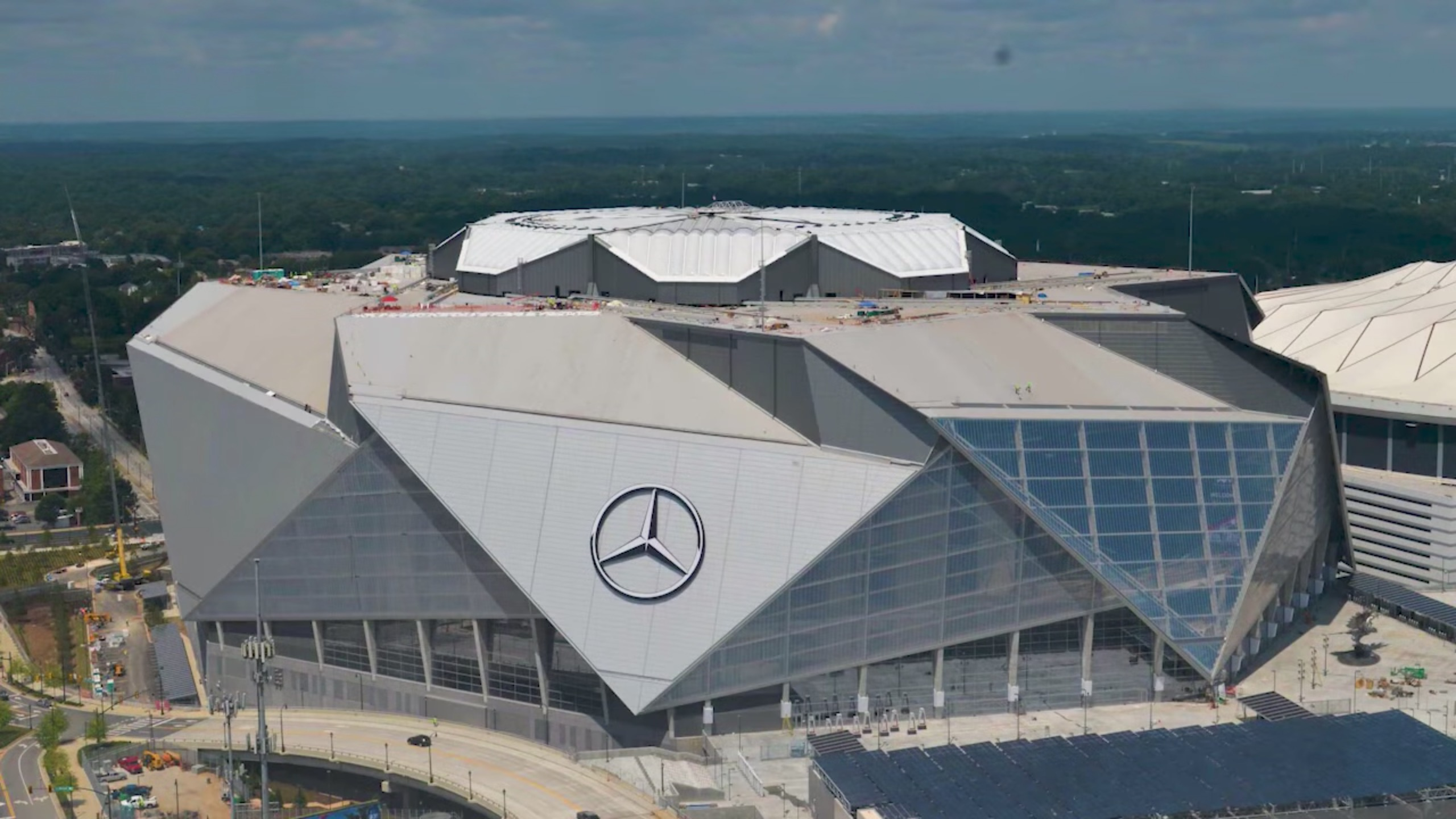
Mercedes-Benz Stadium in Atlanta hosted the final

Mercedes-Benz Stadium in Atlanta hosted the U.S. Open Cup final, the first final to be played there and second U.S. Open Cup match following a Round of 16 fixture hosted by Atlanta United FC in 2018. The stadium opened in 2017 and previously hosted MLS Cup in December 2018 and the Campeones Cup earlier in August 2019. Atlanta was awarded first priority to host the final during the semifinal hosting draw, which was conducted by the United States Soccer Federation on July 11, 2019. It was the thirteenth match and first final in U.S. Open Cup history to be played indoors.

== Broadcasting ==
The match was broadcast on ESPN+, an online streaming service that carried all other matches of the tournament. The competition final had previously been broadcast on national television since 1994, with the exception of the 1996 final. The English language broadcast was called by play-by-play commentator Jon Champion and color analyst Taylor Twellman.

== Match ==
=== Summary ===
The match was watched by 35,709 spectators, breaking the attendance record for the tournament final that was set during the 2011 final in Seattle. Approximately 750 people supporting Minnesota United were seated in the three designated away sections. Atlanta played the same starting lineup that was used a week earlier in MLS play, including a five-midfielder formation, while Minnesota rested Darwin Quintero and replaced him with Hassani Dotson in the starting lineup.

Atlanta missed their first chance to score in the match, a shot from Josef Martínez in the second minute that was ruled offside, but took the lead in the tenth minute through an own goal from Minnesota. Defender Leandro González Pírez received a through ball from Pity Martínez and swung for a high cross from the end line that was deflected by Minnesota defender Chase Gasper over the head of goalkeeper Vito Mannone, who was able to get a touch but unable to save the shot. Minnesota missed a chance to equalize two minutes later as defender Michael Boxall's header was off target, and conceded a second goal to Atlanta in the 16th minute. Justin Meram's low cross from the left flank found Pity Martínez, who shot from the center of the box to claim a 2–0 lead. Five minutes later, Meram passed the ball at the top of the box to Ezequiel Barco, who tried a curling shot that was pushed wide by Mannone.

Minnesota kept pressing for a goal, including a header by Ike Opara in the 33rd minute that went wide of the post, and reduced the lead to 2–1 two minutes after halftime. Minnesota midfielder Kevin Molino ended his run down the right flank with a low pass to Robin Lod at the top of the six-yard box, which he volleyed into the goal off the left post. Within minutes of conceding, Atlanta made two attempts at goal through a shot by Julian Gressel and another by Josef Martínez, but both were saved by Mannone; Martínez also had another shot in the 53rd minute that was ruled offside. Molino had a chance to equalize for Minnesota in the 69th minute after receiving a deflection from Atlanta defender Florentin Pogba, but was unable to beat Brad Guzan with his one-time shot.

Atlanta played the last 16 minutes of the match with 10 players after González Pírez was sent off in the 74th minute, having earned two yellow cards within three minutes for dissent and grabbing Molino off the ball. Minnesota manager Adrian Heath responded by substituting Quintero into the match, while Atlanta's Frank de Boer brought on Franco Escobar and switched to a formation with five defenders to protect the lead. Minnesota had the majority of possession late in the match and earned several corner kicks, but were unable to create a dangerous scoring chance until stoppage time. Opara chested down a ball and shot towards the goal in the first minute of stoppage time, requiring Guzan to make a diving save. In the fourth minute of stoppage time, Opara headed down a cross that fell to Boxall, but his volleyed shot from point-blank range went over the crossbar.

=== Details ===
August 27, 2019
8:00 p.m. EDT

Atlanta United FC	2–1	Minnesota United FC
Gasper 10' (o.g.); G. Martínez 16'	Report	Lod 47'

Mercedes-Benz Stadium, Atlanta, Georgia
Attendance: 35,709
Referee: Allen Chapman

Atlanta United FC	Minnesota United FC

GK	1	(United States) Brad Guzan (c)
DF	5	(Argentina) Leandro González Pírez	(yellow card) 71' (yellow-red card) 74'
DF	12	(United States) Miles Robinson
DF	4	(Guinea) Florentin Pogba
MF	24	(Germany) Julian Gressel		(substituted off) 85'
MF	6	(United States) Darlington Nagbe
MF	11	(Argentina) Eric Remedi
MF	14	(Iraq) Justin Meram
MF	8	(Argentina) Ezequiel Barco		(substituted off) 70'
FW	10	(Argentina) Pity Martínez		(substituted off) 76'
FW	7	(Venezuela) Josef Martínez
Substitutes:
GK	25	(United States) Alec Kann
DF	3	(United States) Michael Parkhurst
DF	18	(United States) Jeff Larentowicz		(substituted in) 85'
MF	29	(England) Mo Adams
FW	16	(United States) Emerson Hyndman		(substituted in) 70'
FW	15	(Paraguay) Héctor Villalba
FW	2	(Argentina) Franco Escobar	(yellow card) 87'	(substituted in) 76'
Manager:
(Netherlands) Frank de Boer

GK	1	(Italy) Vito Mannone
DF	19	(Madagascar) Romain Métanire
DF	3	(United States) Ike Opara
DF	15	(New Zealand) Michael Boxall
DF	77	(United States) Chase Gasper	(yellow card) 87'
MF	8	(Slovakia) Ján Greguš
MF	6	(Cuba) Osvaldo Alonso (c)	(yellow card) 44'	(substituted off) 75'
MF	31	(United States) Hassani Dotson	(yellow card) 29'
MF	7	(Trinidad and Tobago) Kevin Molino		(substituted off) 85'
FW	23	(United States) Mason Toye
FW	16	(Finland) Robin Lod		(substituted off) 70'
Substitutes:
GK	33	(United States) Bobby Shuttleworth
DF	14	(United States) Brent Kallman
MF	25	(Colombia) Darwin Quintero		(substituted in) 75'
MF	10	(United States) Miguel Ibarra
MF	12	(Kenya) Lawrence Olum
FW	13	(United States) Ethan Finlay		(substituted in) 70'
FW	99	(Ghana) Abu Danladi		(substituted in) 85'
Manager:
(England) Adrian Heath

Assistant referees:
Brian Poeschel
Nick Uranga
Fourth official:
Ramy Touchan
Reserve assistant referee:
Brian Dunn

Match rules

- 90 minutes
- 30 minutes of extra time if necessary.
- Penalty shootout if scores still tied.
- Seven named substitutes

== Post-match ==
The U.S. Open Cup was the third trophy to be won by Atlanta United FC within nine months, following the MLS Cup and Campeones Cup. It was also the first time that the U.S. Open Cup was won by a team from the state of Georgia. Atlanta collected $300,000 in prize money as champion and a berth in the 2020 CONCACAF Champions League. As runners-up, Minnesota United FC earned $100,000 in prize money. Atlanta coach Frank de Boer praised his team's performance, particularly the contributions from winger Justin Meram. Minnesota head coach Adrian Heath praised his players for their response to the first two goals and for their progress compared to earlier matches they played in Atlanta. The 2020 U.S. Open Cup was cancelled due to the COVID-19 pandemic; Atlanta United FC was awarded that competition's berth for the 2021 CONCACAF Champions League by U.S. Soccer on December 11, 2020.
