= 2020 Atlanta United FC season =

Atlanta United FC
2020 season
- Owner: Arthur Blank
- President: Darren Eales
- Head coach: Frank de Boer (until July 24); Stephen Glass (interim) (from July 27 - December 16, 2020); Gabriel Heinze (from December 18, 2020)
- Stadium: Mercedes-Benz Stadium; Atlanta, Georgia
- MLS: Conference: 12th Overall: 23rd
- MLS Cup playoffs: Did not qualify
- U.S. Open Cup: Canceled
- Champions League: Quarter-finals
- MLS is Back Tournament: Group stage
- Top goalscorer: League: Jon Gallagher (4 goals); All: Jon Gallagher; Pity Martínez (4 each)
- Highest home attendance: League/All: 69,301 (Mar. 7 vs. FC Cincinnati)
- Average home league attendance: 37,716 (league); 27,968 (all)
- Biggest win: 4 goals: DC 0–4 ATL (Oct. 3)
- Biggest defeat: 3 goals: AME 3–0 ATL (Mar. 11); ORL 4–1 ATL (Oct. 28)
Home colors	Away colors
- All statistics correct as of December 16, 2020.

The 2020 Atlanta United FC season was the fourth season of Atlanta United FC's existence, and the twelfth year that a professional soccer club from Atlanta, Georgia competed in the top division of American soccer. Atlanta United played their home games at Mercedes-Benz Stadium. Outside of MLS, the team made their second appearance in the CONCACAF Champions League, and were set to participate in the 2020 U.S. Open Cup as defending champions, before the tournament's cancelation due to the COVID-19 pandemic.

Following the club's elimination from the MLS is Back Tournament, manager Frank de Boer was fired, with Atlanta United 2 manager Stephen Glass taking over as interim manager for the remainder of the season. The 2020 season was the first time Atlanta United FC finished worse than fourth in the Supporters' Shield table and failed to qualify for the MLS Cup playoffs.

== Club ==
Squad no.	Name	Nationality	Position(s)	Date of birth (age)	Previous club	Apps	Goals
Goalkeepers
1	Brad Guzan (VC)	(United States)	GK	September 9, 1984 (age 42)	(England) Middlesbrough	125	0
13	Brendan Moore	(United States)	GK	April 16, 1992 (age 34)	(England) Rochdale	0	0
25	Alec Kann	(United States)	GK	August 8, 1990 (age 36)	(United States) Sporting Kansas City	25	0
Defenders
2	Franco Escobar	(Argentina)	RB	February 21, 1995 (age 31)	(Argentina) Newell's Old Boys	81	5
4	Anton Walkes	(England)	RB	February 8, 1997 (age 29)	(England) Portsmouth	43	2
6	Fernando Meza	(Argentina)	CB	March 21, 1990 (age 36)	(Mexico) Tijuana	17	0
11	Brooks Lennon	(United States)	RB	September 22, 1997 (age 28)	(United States) Real Salt Lake	26	2
12	Miles Robinson (GA)	(United States)	CB	March 14, 1997 (age 29)	(United States) Syracuse University	77	1
19	Edgar Castillo	(United States)	LB	October 3, 1986 (age 39)	(United States) New England Revolution	4	0
21	George Bello (HGP)	(United States)	LB	January 22, 2002 (age 24)	(United States) Atlanta United Academy	25	2
26	Jon Gallagher	(Republic of Ireland)	RB	February 24, 1996 (age 30)	(United States) University of Notre Dame	16	4
32	George Campbell (HGP)	(United States)	CB	June 22, 2001 (age 25)	(United States) Atlanta United Academy	1	0
34	Jack Gurr	(England)	RB	November 26, 1995 (age 30)	(United States) Atlanta United 2	1	0
Midfielders
5	Eric Remedi	(Argentina)	DM	June 4, 1995 (age 31)	(Argentina) Banfield	78	3
8	Ezequiel Barco (DP)	(Argentina)	AM	March 23, 1999 (age 27)	(Argentina) Independiente	78	11
9	Matheus Rossetto	(Brazil)	AM	June 3, 1996 (age 30)	(Brazil) Athletico Paranaense	17	0
10	Marcelino Moreno (DP)	(Argentina)	CM	June 25, 1994 (age 32)	(Argentina) Lanús	7	2
15	Manuel Castro	(Uruguay)	RW	September 27, 1995 (age 30)	(Argentina) Estudiantes	11	0
18	Jeff Larentowicz (C)	(United States)	DM	August 5, 1983 (age 43)	(United States) LA Galaxy	132	5
20	Emerson Hyndman	(United States)	CM	April 7, 1996 (age 30)	(England) AFC Bournemouth	45	5
22	Jürgen Damm	(Mexico)	RW	November 7, 1992 (age 33)	(Mexico) UANL	14	0
23	Jake Mulraney	(Republic of Ireland)	AM	April 5, 1996 (age 30)	(Scotland) Hearts	21	1
27	Laurence Wyke	(England)	DM	September 20, 1996 (age 29)	(United States) Atlanta United 2	7	0
28	Tyler Wolff (HGP)	(United States)	RW	February 13, 2003 (age 23)	(United States) Atlanta United Academy	5	0
29	Mo Adams (GA)	(England)	CM	September 23, 1996 (age 29)	(United States) Chicago Fire FC	22	1
Forwards
7	Josef Martínez (DP)	(Venezuela)	CF	May 19, 1993 (age 33)	(Italy) Torino	103	90
14	Adam Jahn	(United States)	CF	January 5, 1991 (age 35)	(United States) Phoenix Rising	24	3
16	Erik López	(Paraguay)	CF	November 27, 2001 (age 24)	(Paraguay) Olimpia	1	0
31	Erick Torres	(Mexico)	CF	January 19, 1993 (age 33)	(Mexico) Tijuana	14	1
36	Jackson Conway	(United States)	CF	December 3, 2001 (age 24)	(United States) Atlanta United 2	1	1

=== International roster slots ===
Atlanta had eight International Roster Slots for use in the 2020 season. During the 2020 offseason, Franco Escobar, Ezequiel Barco, and Eric Remedi acquired green cards, making them domestic players for MLS roster purposes.

Atlanta United International Roster Slots
Slot	Player	Country
1	Manuel Castro	Uruguay
2	Jürgen Damm	Mexico
3	Fernando Meza	Argentina
4	Marcelino Moreno	Argentina
5	Jake Mulraney	(Republic of Ireland) Ireland
6	Matheus Rossetto	Brazil
7	Anton Walkes	England
8	Laurence Wyke	England

== Results ==
=== Non-competitive ===
Win Draw Loss

==== Friendlies ====
January 24, 2020 Friendly	New York Red Bulls	1–2	Atlanta United	Bradenton, Florida
	Valot 7'	Report	J. Martínez; Barco	Stadium: IMG Academy; Attendance: 0
Note: Played in three 30-minute periods.

January 29, 2020 Friendly	Philadelphia Union	0–4	Atlanta United	Bradenton, Florida
		Report; Report	J. Martínez; Collin (o.g.); G. Martínez	Stadium: IMG Academy; Attendance: 0

February 1, 2020 Friendly	Atlanta United	1–1	IF Elfsborg	Bradenton, Florida
	G. Martínez 55'	Report	Karlsson 67'	Stadium: IMG Academy; Attendance: 0

February 8, 2020 Friendly	Birmingham Legion	2–3	Atlanta United	Birmingham, Alabama
4:00 p.m. EST	Brett 47' (pen.); Mensah 80'	Report	Barco 44'; Jahn 67' (pen.); Rossetto 90+2'	Stadium: BBVA Field; Attendance: 6,722

February 11, 2020 Friendly	U. de G.	0–0 (3–1 p)	Atlanta United	Guadalajara, Mexico
9:00 p.m. EST		Report; Report		Stadium: Estadio Jalisco
	Penalties
	Hernández (penalty scored); Ceballos (penalty missed); Durán (penalty scored); Valenzuela (penalty scored)		(penalty scored) J. Martínez; (penalty missed) Meza; (penalty missed) Hyndman; (penalty missed) Barco

=== Major League Soccer ===
On March 12, 2020, the season entered a month-long suspension due to the COVID-19 pandemic in North America, following the cancellation of several matches. On March 19, the suspension was extended until May 10, and on April 17, the suspension was extended further to June 8. The COVID-19 pandemic caused the first interruption of regular season play since the 2001 MLS season, in which many late regular season games were cancelled due to the September 11 attacks.

On June 10, MLS announced that a bracket format dubbed the "MLS is Back Tournament" would begin July 8 at ESPN Wide World of Sports Complex in Walt Disney World, and end with the final on August 11. The three group stage matches would count towards the regular season standings. Following the tournament, the MLS regular season resumed with a revised schedule, concluding with the playoffs and MLS Cup 2020.

==== League tables ====
===== Eastern Conference =====
Pos	Team	Pld	W	L	T	GF	GA	GD	Pts	PPG	Qualification
10	Inter Miami CF	23	7	13	3	25	35	−10	24	1.04	Qualification for the playoffs play-in round
11	Chicago Fire FC	23	5	10	8	33	39	−6	23	1.00	
12	Atlanta United FC	23	6	13	4	23	30	−7	22	0.96	Qualification for the 2021 CONCACAF Champions League (Note: As 2019 U.S. Open Cup champions)
13	D.C. United	23	5	12	6	25	41	−16	21	0.91	
14	FC Cincinnati	23	4	15	4	12	36	−24	16	0.70	

Source: MLS
Rules for classification: 1) points per game; 2) total wins per match played; 3) total goal differential per match played; 4) total goals scored per match played; 5) fewest disciplinary points per match played; 6) away goal differential per away match played; 7) away goals scored per away match played; 8) home goal differential per home match played; 9) home goals scored per home match played; 10) coin toss or drawing of lots.

===== Overall =====
2020 MLS overall standings
Pos	Team	Pld	W	L	T	GF	GA	GD	Pts	PPG	Qualification
21	Real Salt Lake	22	5	10	7	25	35	−10	22	1.00	
22	Chicago Fire FC	23	5	10	8	33	39	−6	23	1.00	
23	Atlanta United FC (U)	23	6	13	4	23	30	−7	22	0.96	2021 CONCACAF Champions League (Note: As 2019 U.S. Open Cup champions (USA4))
24	D.C. United	23	5	12	6	25	41	−16	21	0.91	
25	Houston Dynamo	23	4	10	9	30	40	−10	21	0.91	

Source: MLS
Rules for classification: 1) points per game; 2) total wins per match played; 3) total goal differential per match played; 4) total goals scored per match played; 5) fewest disciplinary points per match played; 6) away goal differential per away match played; 7) away goals scored per away match played; 8) home goal differential per home match played; 9) home goals scored per home match played; 10) coin toss or drawing of lots.
(U) U.S. Open Cup winners

==== MLS is Back Tournament - Group E ====
Group E results
Pos	Team	Pld	W	D	L	GF	GA	GD	Pts	Qualification
1	Columbus Crew SC	3	3	0	0	7	0	+7	9	Advanced to knockout stage
2	FC Cincinnati	3	2	0	1	3	4	−1	6	Advanced to knockout stage
3	New York Red Bulls	3	1	0	2	1	4	−3	3	
4	Atlanta United	3	0	0	3	0	3	−3	0	

Source: MLS

===== Results summary =====
Overall								Home						Away					
Pld	W	D	L	GF	GA	GD	Pts	W	D	L	GF	GA	GD	W	D	L	GF	GA	GD
20	6	4	10	23	27	−4	22	4	2	4	10	9	+1	2	2	6	13	18	−5

Source: Match reports

*Table does not include three group stage matches of MLS is Back Tournament*

===== Results by round =====
Round	1	2	3	4	5	6	7	8	9	10	11	12	13	14	15	16	17	18	19	20	21	22
Stadium	A	H	N	N	N	H	A	H	H	A	A	H	H	A	A	H	H	A	A	H	H	A
Result	W	W	L	L	L	W	L	D	D	L	L	L	W	L	W	D	L	D	L	L	W	L
Position (conf.)	2	1	3	6	7	8	8	9	7	8	10	12	8	10	8	9	9	10	11	12	12	12
Position (league)	5	3	5	8	14	12	14	16	17	17	20	23	18	22	16	16	18	20	22	23	23	23

Updated to match(es) played on November 8, 2020. Source: Match reports
A = Away; H = Home; W = Win; D = Draw; L = Loss

===== Matches =====
Win Draw Loss

February 29, 2020 1	Nashville SC	1–2	Atlanta United	Nashville, Tennessee
8:00 p.m. EST	Zimmerman 28'; Willis (yellow card) 90+4'	Report	Barco 9'; Hyndman 37'; Remedi (yellow card) 76'	Stadium: Nissan Stadium; Attendance: 59,069; Referee: Drew Fischer

March 7, 2020 2	Atlanta United	2–1	FC Cincinnati	Atlanta, Georgia
7:00 p.m. EST	Barco 21'; Hyndman 55'; Rossetto (yellow card) 75'	Report	Waston (yellow card) 4'; Garza (yellow card) 34'; Amaya (yellow card) 53'; Kubo 64'; Cruz (yellow card) 89'	Stadium: Mercedes-Benz Stadium; Attendance: 69,301; Referee: Robert Sibiga

July 11, 2020 3 MLS is Back GS	Atlanta United	0–1	New York Red Bulls	Bay Lake, Florida
8:00 p.m. EST	Escobar (yellow card) 42'; G. Martínez (yellow card) 45+3'	Report	Valot 4'; Parker (yellow card) 90+5'	Stadium: ESPN Wide World of Sports Complex; Attendance: 0 (behind closed doors); Referee: Allen Chapman
Note: MLS is Back Tournament Group Stage matches will count toward the MLS Regular Season Standings

July 16, 2020 4 MLS is Back GS	Atlanta United	0–1	FC Cincinnati	Bay Lake, Florida
9:00 a.m. EST	Mulraney (yellow card) 12' (yellow-red card) 26'; Barco (yellow card) 43'; Escobar (yellow card) 88'; Robinson (yellow card) 90+5'; Williams (red card) 90+10'	Report	Deplagne (yellow card) 48'; Amaya 76', (yellow card) 86'; Stanko (yellow card) 90+12'	Stadium: ESPN Wide World of Sports Complex; Attendance: 0 Referee: Victor Rivas
Note: MLS is Back Tournament Group Stage matches will count toward the MLS Regular Season Standings

July 21, 2020 5 MLS is Back GS	Atlanta United	0–1	Columbus Crew	Bay Lake, Florida
8:00 p.m. EST	Escobar (yellow card) 45+4'; Robinson (yellow card) 73'	Report	Mokhtar 18'; Valenzuela (yellow card) 25'; Santos (yellow card) 60'; Jiménez (yellow card) 85'; Díaz (yellow card) 90+3'	Stadium: ESPN Wide World of Sports Complex; Attendance: 0 Referee: Timothy Ford
Note: MLS is Back Tournament Group Stage matches will count toward the MLS Regular Season Standings

August 22, 2020 6	Atlanta United	2–0	Nashville SC	Atlanta, Georgia
7:00 p.m. EST	Lennon (yellow card) 6'; Walkes (yellow card) 28'; G. Martínez 40', 87'; Bello (yellow card) 78'	Report	Lovitz (yellow card) 48'	Stadium: Mercedes-Benz Stadium; Referee: Ted Unkel

August 29, 2020 7	Atlanta United	1–3	Orlando City SC	Atlanta, Georgia
3:30 p.m. EST	Lennon 83'	Report	Urso 13', (yellow card) 88'; Mueller 35'; Smith (yellow card) 45+1'; Perea (yellow card) 84'; Nani 86'; Carlos (yellow card) 88'; Ruan (yellow card) 90+9'	Stadium: Mercedes-Benz Stadium

September 2, 2020 8	Atlanta United	0–0	Inter Miami CF	Atlanta, Georgia
7:00 p.m. EST	Walkes (yellow card) 41'; Mulraney (yellow card) 87'; Damm (yellow card) 90+2'	Report	Chapman (yellow card) 30'; Pirez (yellow card) 53'; Sweat (yellow card) 90+2'	Stadium: Mercedes-Benz Stadium; Referee: Guido Gonzales Jr.

September 5, 2020 9	Orlando City SC	1–1	Atlanta United	Orlando, Florida
7:30 p.m. EST	Michel 45+1'; Méndez (yellow card) 64'	Report	Escobar (yellow card) 39'; Torres (yellow card) 41'; Larentowicz (yellow card) 70'; Lennon (yellow card) 78'; Jahn 90+2'	Stadium: Exploria Stadium; Referee: Victor Rivas

September 9, 2020 10	Inter Miami CF	2–1	Atlanta United	Fort Lauderdale, Florida
8:00 p.m. EST	Morgan 28', 38'; Figal (yellow card) 40'; Pirez (yellow card) 45+5'; Nealis (yellow card) 75'	Report	Robinson (yellow card) 9'; Remedi 33'; Larentowicz (yellow card) 86'	Stadium: Inter Miami CF Stadium; Referee: Robert Sibiga

September 12, 2020 11	Nashville SC	4–2	Atlanta United	Nashville, Tennessee
8:30 p.m. EST	Badji 1'; Mukhtar 28'; McCarty 36'; Danladi 57'	Report	Larentowicz 19'; Bello 61'; Remedi (yellow card) 63'	Stadium: Nissan Stadium; Referee: Armando Villarreal

September 19, 2020 12	Atlanta United	1–2	Inter Miami CF	Atlanta, Georgia
7:00 p.m. EST	Gallagher 5'	Report	Agudelo 2'; Shea 11'; Reyes (yellow card) 66'; Robles (yellow card) 90+3'	Stadium: Mercedes-Benz Stadium; Referee: Jair Marrufo

September 23, 2020 13	Atlanta United	1–0	FC Dallas	Atlanta, Georgia
7:00 p.m. EST	Larentowicz 55' (pen.)	Report	Bressan (yellow card) 47'	Stadium: Mercedes-Benz Stadium; Referee: Timothy Ford

September 27, 2020 14	Chicago Fire FC	2–0	Atlanta United	Chicago, Illinois
7:30 p.m. EST	Herbers 7'; Berić 39'	Report	Adams (yellow card) 85'	Stadium: Soldier Field; Referee: Kevin Stott

October 3, 2020 15	D.C. United	0–4	Atlanta United	Washington, D.C.
7:00 p.m. EST	Brillant (red card) 85'; Asad (yellow card) 90+5'	Report	Gallagher 4', 65'; Bello (yellow card) 29'; Robinson (yellow card) 37'; Lennon 41'; Hyndman (yellow card) 43'; Jahn 70'	Stadium: Audi Field; Referee: Joseph Dickerson

October 7, 2020 16	Atlanta United	0–0	Orlando City SC	Atlanta, Georgia
7:00 p.m. EST	Escobar (yellow card) 36'; Adams (yellow card) 50'; Robinson (yellow card) 90'	Report	Miller (yellow card) 77'; Schlegel (yellow card) 81'	Stadium: Mercedes-Benz Stadium; Referee: Rubiel Vazquez

October 10, 2020 17	Atlanta United	0–1	New York Red Bulls	Atlanta, Georgia
6:00 p.m. EST	Mulraney (yellow card) 66'; Hyndman (yellow card) 90+5'	Report	Clark 47'; Davis (yellow card) 52'; Parker (yellow card) 90+3'	Stadium: Mercedes-Benz Stadium; Referee: Jair Marrufo

October 14, 2020 18	Inter Miami CF	1–1	Atlanta United	Fort Lauderdale, Florida
8:00 p.m. EST	Shea 80'; Trapp (yellow card) 90'	Report	Remedi (yellow card) 8'; Lennon (yellow card) 48'; Jahn (yellow card) 69'; Mulraney 83'; Wyke (yellow card) 86'	Stadium: Inter Miami CF Stadium; Referee: Ismail Elfath

October 18, 2020 19	Toronto FC	1–0	Atlanta United	East Hartford, Connecticut
7:30 p.m. EST	Gonzalez (yellow card) 42'; Piatti 89'	Report	Robinson (yellow card) 81'	Stadium: Pratt & Whitney Stadium; Referee: Fotis Bazakos

October 24, 2020 20	Atlanta United	1–2	D.C. United	Atlanta, Georgia
4:00 p.m. EST	Barco (yellow card) 39'; Gallagher 89'; Meza (yellow card) 90+1'	Report	Asad (yellow card) 30'; Canouse 77'; Moreno (yellow card) 86'; Rivas 90+2'	Stadium: Mercedes-Benz Stadium; Referee: Armando Villarreal

October 28, 2020 21	Orlando City SC	4–1	Atlanta United	Orlando, Florida
7:30 p.m. EST	Dike 29'; Mueller 45+2'; Akindele 60'; Michel (yellow card) 88'; Aiás 90+2'	Report	Meza (yellow card) 45+1'; Remedi (yellow card) 81'; Torres 87'; Adams (yellow card) 90+1'	Stadium: Exploria Stadium; Referee: Alex Chilowicz

November 1, 2020 22	Atlanta United	2–0	FC Cincinnati	Atlanta, Georgia
7:00 p.m. EST	Jahn 8', (yellow card) 22'; Moreno 26' (pen.)	Report	Amaya (yellow card) 45+3'; Gutman (yellow card) 90+3'	Stadium: Mercedes-Benz Stadium; Referee: Alan Kelly

November 8, 2020 23	Columbus Crew	2–1	Atlanta United	Columbus, Ohio
3:30 p.m. EST	Zelarayán (yellow card) 17', (goal) 28'; Zardes 55'; Valenzuela (yellow card) 59'; Nagbe (yellow card) 90+5'	Report	Escobar (yellow card) 11' (yellow-red card) 90+1'; Moreno 59' (pen.); Barco (yellow card) 88'; Guzan (yellow card) 90+6'	Stadium: Mapfre Stadium; Referee: Ismail Elfath

==== U.S. Open Cup ====
Originally, Atlanta United FC were to begin play by the 19th or the 20th of May. However, the tournament was suspended and eventually cancelled due to the COVID-19 pandemic.

=== CONCACAF Champions League ===
==== Round of 16 ====
February 18, 2020 First leg	Motagua (Honduras)	1–1	(United States) Atlanta United	San Pedro Sula, Honduras
10:00 p.m. EST	Moreira 34'; Crisanto (yellow card) 78'	Report	J. Martínez 35', (yellow card) 45+1'; Escobar (yellow card) 52'	Stadium: Estadio Olímpico Metropolitano; Referee: Adonai Escobedo (Mexico)

February 25, 2020 Second leg	Atlanta United (United States)	3–0 (4–1 agg.)	(Honduras) Motagua	Kennesaw
8:00 p.m. EST	G. Martínez 40', 83'; J. Martínez 61'	Report		Stadium: Fifth Third Bank Stadium; Attendance: 8,474; Referee: Keylor Herrera Villalobos (Costa Rica)

==== Quarter-finals ====
March 11, 2020 First leg	América (Mexico)	3–0	(United States) Atlanta United	Mexico City, Mexico
10:30 p.m. EDT	Suárez 11'; Martín 13'; Valdez 36', (yellow card) 64'	Report	Mulraney (yellow card) 42'	Stadium: Estadio Azteca; Attendance: 20,731; Referee: John Pitti (Panama)

December 16, 2020 Second leg	Atlanta United (United States)	1–0 (1–3 agg.)	América (Mexico)	Orlando
8:00 p.m. EDT	Remedi (yellow card) 27'; Conway 82'; Moreno (red card) 90'; Robinson (yellow card) 90+3'	Report	Naveda (yellow card) 90'	Stadium: Exploria Stadium; Attendance: 0 Referee: Ismael Cornejo (El Salvador)
Note: Postponed due to the COVID-19 pandemic. The match was originally scheduled to take place at Fifth Third Bank Stadium, Kennesaw on March 18, 2020 (8:15 p.m. UTC−4).

== Statistics ==
=== Appearances and goals ===
As of December 16, 2020

No.	Pos	Nat	Player	Total		MLS		MLS Cup Playoffs		U.S. Open Cup		Champions League	
No.	Pos	Nat	Player	Apps	Goals	Apps	Goals	Apps	Goals	Apps	Goals	Apps	Goals
Goalkeepers
1	GK	(United States) USA	Brad Guzan	27	0	23	0	0	0	0	0	4	0
Defenders
2	DF	(Argentina) ARG	Franco Escobar	19	0	16	0	0	0	0	0	3	0
4	DF	(England) ENG	Anton Walkes	20	0	15+2	0	0	0	0	0	3	0
6	DF	(Argentina) ARG	Fernando Meza	17	0	13	0	0	0	0	0	4	0
11	DF	(United States) USA	Brooks Lennon	26	2	19+4	2	0	0	0	0	2+1	0
12	DF	(United States) USA	Miles Robinson	18	0	16+1	0	0	0	0	0	1	0
19	DF	(United States) USA	Edgar Castillo	4	0	1+3	0	0	0	0	0	0	0
21	DF	(United States) USA	George Bello	21	1	19+1	1	0	0	0	0	1	0
26	DF	(Republic of Ireland) IRL	Jon Gallagher	16	4	11+5	4	0	0	0	0	0	0
32	DF	(United States) USA	George Campbell	1	0	0+1	0	0	0	0	0	0	0
34	DF	(England) ENG	Jack Gurr	1	0	0	0	0	0	0	0	0+1	0
Midfielders
5	MF	(Argentina) ARG	Eric Remedi	22	1	13+5	1	0	0	0	0	4	0
8	MF	(Argentina) ARG	Ezequiel Barco	19	2	11+4	2	0	0	0	0	4	0
9	MF	(Brazil) BRA	Matheus Rossetto	17	0	10+5	0	0	0	0	0	0+2	0
10	MF	(Argentina) ARG	Marcelino Moreno	7	2	5+1	2	0	0	0	0	0+1	0
15	MF	(Uruguay) URU	Manuel Castro	11	0	3+7	0	0	0	0	0	0+1	0
18	MF	(United States) USA	Jeff Larentowicz	21	2	10+8	2	0	0	0	0	2+1	0
20	MF	(United States) USA	Emerson Hyndman	24	2	16+4	2	0	0	0	0	4	0
22	MF	(Mexico) MEX	Jürgen Damm	14	0	7+7	0	0	0	0	0	0	0
23	MF	(Republic of Ireland) IRL	Jake Mulraney	21	1	8+10	1	0	0	0	0	3	0
27	MF	(England) ENG	Laurence Wyke	7	0	2+5	0	0	0	0	0	0	0
28	MF	(United States) USA	Tyler Wolff	5	0	1+4	0	0	0	0	0	0	0
29	MF	(England) ENG	Mo Adams	16	0	9+4	0	0	0	0	0	2+1	0
Forwards
7	FW	(Venezuela) VEN	Josef Martínez	3	2	1	0	0	0	0	0	2	2
16	FW	(Paraguay) PAR	Erik López	1	0	0	0	0	0	0	0	1	0
14	FW	(United States) USA	Adam Jahn	24	3	13+8	3	0	0	0	0	1+2	0
31	FW	(Mexico) MEX	Erick Torres	14	1	3+10	1	0	0	0	0	0+1	0
36	FW	(United States) USA	Jackson Conway	1	1	0	0	0	0	0	0	0+1	1
Players who have played for Atlanta United this season but have left the club:
10	MF	(Argentina) ARG	Pity Martínez	10	4	7	2	0	0	0	0	3	2
22	MF	(Brazil) BRA	Luiz Fernando	1	0	0	0	0	0	0	0	0+1	0
24	FW	(United States) USA	JJ Williams	1	0	0+1	0	0	0	0	0	0	0

=== Top scorers ===
As of December 17, 2020

Place	Position	Name	MLS	Playoffs	U.S. Open Cup	Champions League	Total
1	MF	(Republic of Ireland) Jon Gallagher	4	0	0	0	4
1	MF	(Argentina) Pity Martínez	2	0	0	2	4
3	FW	(United States) Adam Jahn	3	0	0	0	3
4	FW	(Argentina) Ezequiel Barco	2	0	0	0	2
4	MF	(United States) Emerson Hyndman	2	0	0	0	2
4	MF	(United States) Jeff Larentowicz	2	0	0	0	2
4	DF	(United States) Brooks Lennon	2	0	0	0	2
4	FW	(Venezuela) Josef Martínez	0	0	0	2	2
4	MF	(Argentina) Marcelino Moreno	2	0	0	0	2
10	DF	(United States) George Bello	1	0	0	0	1
10	MF	(Republic of Ireland) Jake Mulraney	1	0	0	0	1
10	MF	(Argentina) Eric Remedi	1	0	0	0	1
10	FW	(Mexico) Erick Torres	1	0	0	0	1
10	FW	(United States) Jackson Conway	0	0	0	1	1
Total			23	0	0	5	28

== Player movement ==
=== In ===
No.	Pos.	Player	Transferred from	Type	US	Fee/notes	Date	Source
—	DF	(Venezuela) José Hernández	(United States) Atlanta United 2	Loan return	Non–US	Free	November 21, 2019	
35	FW	(Nigeria) Patrick Okonkwo	(United States) Atlanta United 2	Loan return	US	Free	November 21, 2019	
23	MF	(United States) Lagos Kunga	(United States) Memphis 901	Loan return	US	Free	November 30, 2019	
11	DF	(United States) Brooks Lennon	(United States) Real Salt Lake	Trade	US	$300K in GAM & TAM	December 2, 2019	
20	MF	(United States) Emerson Hyndman	(England) AFC Bournemouth	Transfer	US	Undisclosed	December 9, 2019	
32	DF	(United States) George Campbell	(United States) Atlanta United Academy	Transfer	US	Signed as a Homegrown Player (HGP)	January 1, 2020	
4	DF	(England) Anton Walkes	(England) Portsmouth	Transfer	Non-US	Undisclosed	January 9, 2020	
6	DF	(Argentina) Fernando Meza	(Mexico) Tijuana	Transfer	Non-US	Undisclosed	January 10, 2020	
19	DF	(United States) Edgar Castillo	(United States) New England Revolution	Transfer	US	Free	January 17, 2020	
14	FW	(United States) Adam Jahn	(United States) Phoenix Rising	Transfer	US	Undisclosed and 2020 loan rights to Lagos Kunga	January 21, 2020	
23	MF	(Republic of Ireland) Jake Mulraney	(Scotland) Heart of Midlothian	Transfer	Non-US	Undisclosed	January 23, 2020	
9	MF	(Brazil) Matheus Rossetto	(Brazil) Athletico Paranaense	Transfer	Non-US	Undisclosed	February 3, 2020	
27	MF	(England) Laurence Wyke	(United States) Atlanta United 2	Transfer	Non-US	Undisclosed	March 5, 2020	
24	FW	(United States) JJ Williams	Generation Adidas	Transfer	US	Undisclosed	March 8, 2020	
22	MF	(Mexico) Jürgen Damm	(Mexico) UANL	Transfer	Non-US	Free	July 1, 2020	
28	FW	(United States) Tyler Wolff	(United States) Atlanta United Academy	Transfer	US	Signed as a Homegrown Player (HGP)	July 2, 2020	
31	FW	(Mexico) Erick Torres	(Mexico) Tijuana	Transfer	US	Free	July 31, 2020	
—	MF	(Argentina) Marcelino Moreno	(Argentina) Lanús	Transfer	Non-US	$7 Million, Signed as Designated Player	September 22, 2020	

==== SuperDraft picks ====
Draft picks are not automatically signed to the team roster. Only trades involving draft picks and executed after the start of 2020 MLS SuperDraft are listed in the notes. Atlanta had two selections in the draft.

2020 Atlanta United SuperDraft Picks
Round	Selection	Player	Position	College	Status
1	23	(Denmark) Patrick Nielsen	DF	Michigan State	Non-US
3	75	(United States) Phillip Goodrum	FW	UNC Wilmington	US

==== Loan in ====
No.	Pos.	Player	Loaned From	US	Start	End	Source
15	MF	(Uruguay) Manuel Castro	(Argentina) Estudiantes	Non-US	February 12, 2020	End of Season (Note: Castro's loan was originally until June 30th, but was later extended until the end of the 2020 MLS season.)	
33	FW	(United States) Phillip Goodrum	(United States) Atlanta United 2	US	February 18, 2020	February 22, 2020	
27	MF	(England) Laurence Wyke	(United States) Atlanta United 2	Non-US	February 29, 2020	March 3, 2020	
37	GK	(United States) Ben Lundgaard	(United States) Atlanta United 2	US	December 15, 2020	December 19, 2020	
34	DF	(England) Jack Gurr	(United States) Atlanta United 2	Non-US	December 15, 2020	December 19, 2020	
16	FW	(Paraguay) Erik López	(United States) Atlanta United 2	Non-US	December 15, 2020	December 19, 2020	
33	FW	(United States) Phillip Goodrum	(United States) Atlanta United 2	US	December 15, 2020	December 19, 2020	

=== Out ===
No.	Pos.	Player	Transferred to	Type	US	Fee/notes	Date	Source
3	DF	(United States) Michael Parkhurst	N/A	Retired	US	Free	October 31, 2019	
6	MF	(United States) Darlington Nagbe	(United States) Columbus Crew	Trade	US	$1.05 Million in TAM & GAM, 2020 International Roster Slot	November 13, 2019	
19	FW	(United States) Brandon Vazquez	(United States) Nashville SC	Expansion Draft	US	$50K in GAM	November 19, 2019	
4	DF	(Guinea) Florentin Pogba	(France) Sochaux	Option Declined	Non-US	Free	November 21, 2019	
14	MF	(Iraq) Justin Meram	(United States) Real Salt Lake	Option Declined	US	Free	November 21, 2019	
20	DF	(United States) Brek Shea	(United States) Inter Miami CF	Out of Contract	US	Free	November 21, 2019	
22	DF	(United States) Mikey Ambrose	(United States) Inter Miami CF	Option Declined	US	Selected in first round of re-entry draft	November 21, 2019	
27	MF	(United States) Chris Goslin	End-of-Year Waivers	Option Declined	US	Free	November 21, 2019	
32	MF	(Germany) Kevin Kratz	End-of-Year Waivers	Out of Contract	US	Free	November 21, 2019	
35	FW	(Nigeria) Patrick Okonkwo	End-of-Year Waivers	Option Declined	US	Free	November 21, 2019	
—	DF	(Venezuela) José Hernández	Atlético Venezuela	Option Declined	Non-US	Free	November 21, 2019	
28	MF	(England) Dion Pereira	Free agent	Released	Non-US	Free	January 9, 2020	
5	DF	(Argentina) Leandro González Pírez	(Mexico) Tijuana	Transfer	US	Undisclosed	January 10, 2020	
24	MF	(Germany) Julian Gressel	(United States) D.C. United	Trade	US	Up to $1.1M in TAM	January 21, 2020	
15	MF	(Paraguay) Héctor Villalba	(Paraguay) Club Libertad	Transfer	US	Undisclosed	January 31, 2020	
22	MF	(Brazil) Luiz Fernando	Free agent	Waived	Non-US	Free	July 1, 2020	
10	MF	(Argentina) Pity Martínez	(Saudi Arabia) Al-Nassr	Transfer	Non-US	$18 Million	September 7, 2020	

=== Loan out ===
No.	Pos.	Player	Loaned to	Start	End	Source
26	MF	(Republic of Ireland) Jon Gallagher	(Scotland) Aberdeen	June 21, 2019 (Note: Gallagher's loan was originally until the end of the 2019 U.S. season, but was later extended until the end of the 2019-2020 Scottish season.)	May 30, 2020	
23	MF	(United States) Lagos Kunga	(United States) Phoenix Rising	January 21, 2020	End of season	
30	MF	(United States) Andrew Carleton	(United States) Indy Eleven	January 24, 2020	End of season	
24	FW	(United States) JJ Williams	(United States) Birmingham Legion	September 10, 2020	End of season	

=== Non-player transfers ===
Acquired	From	For	Source
Discovery rights for Jürgen Damm	(United States) Houston Dynamo	$50K in GAM	

== Honors ==
=== Weekly / monthly ===
==== MLS team / player / coach of the week ====
Week	Team of the week		Player of the week	Coach of the week	Ref
Week	Starting XI	Bench	Player of the week	Coach of the week	Ref
1		(Argentina) Ezequiel Barco			
2	(Argentina) Ezequiel Barco (2) (Argentina) Pity Martínez				
MLS is Back; Round 1		(United States) Brad Guzan			
6	(Argentina) Pity Martínez (2)				
10		(United States) Adam Jahn			
13	(Argentina) Fernando Meza				
15	(Republic of Ireland) Jon Gallagher (United States) Brooks Lennon				
16	(United States) Brad Guzan (2)				
18		(United States) Brad Guzan (3)			
22		(Argentina) Marcelino Moreno			

==== MLS goal of the week ====
Week	Player	Ref
1	(United States) Emerson Hyndman	
6	(Argentina) Pity Martínez	
15	(United States) Brooks Lennon	
