= Esequiel Barco =

Argentine footballer (born 1999)

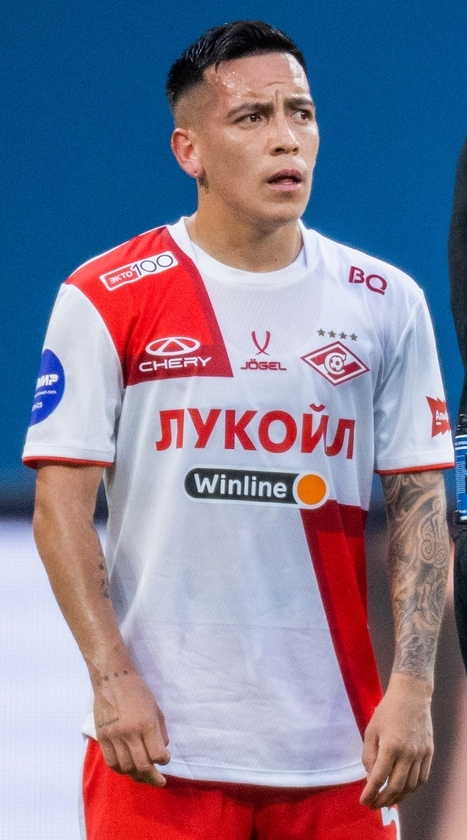
- Barco playing for Spartak Moscow in August 2024

Personal information
- Full name: Esequiel Omar Barco
- Date of birth: 29 March 1999 (age 27)
- Place of birth: Villa Gobernador Gálvez, Argentina
- Height: 1.67 m (5 ft 6 in)
- Positions: Attacking midfielder; winger

Team information
- Current team: Spartak Moscow
- Number: 5

Youth career
- –2015: Jorge Griffa
- 2015–2016: Independiente

Senior career*
Years	Team	Apps	(Gls)
2016–2018	Independiente	38	(5)
2018–2023	Atlanta United	81	(17)
2022–2023	→ River Plate (loan)	76	(10)
2024	River Plate	20	(1)
2024–	Spartak Moscow	66	(22)

International career^{‡}
2017–2019	Argentina U20	9	(2)
2021	Argentina Olympic	3	(0)
- * Club domestic league appearances and goals as of 8 November 2026 ‡ National team caps and goals as of 13:44, 28 July 2021 (UTC)

Esequiel Omar Barco (born 29 March 1999) is an Argentine professional footballer who plays as an attacking midfielder and winger for Russian Premier League club Spartak Moscow.

Born in Villa Gobernador Gálvez, Barco began his career with Independiente. He was promoted to the first team and made his debut during the 2016–17 season. Barco played two seasons with Independiente before signing with American side Atlanta United in 2018. At the international level, Barco has represented Argentina at the under-20's.

== Club career ==
=== Independiente ===
Born in Villa Gobernador Gálvez, Santa Fe, Barco joined Independiente's youth setup in 2015 from AA Jorge Bernardo Griffa. Promoted to the first team by manager Gabriel Milito in July 2016, he signed his first professional contract later that month.

Barco made his first team – and Primera División – debut on 28 August 2016, coming on as a second-half substitute for Jesús Méndez in a 1–0 away win against Belgrano. He scored his first professional goal on 11 September, netting the last in a 2–0 home defeat of Godoy Cruz.

Barco finished his first senior season with four goals in 30 league appearances. As a starter during the 2017 Copa Sudamericana, he scored the equalizer in the second leg of the Final against Flamengo through a penalty kick.

=== Atlanta United ===
On 19 January 2018, Barco joined Major League Soccer club Atlanta United as a designated player. The transfer fee paid by Atlanta United was reported to be $15 million, an MLS record. Barco made his debut for Atlanta United on 15 April 2018 in a 2–2 draw against New York City FC, coming on as a 70th-minute substitute for Kevin Kratz. He scored his first goal for the club on 5 May 2018 against the Chicago Fire. He scored the opening goal as Atlanta United won 2–1.

Barco was on the bench for Atlanta United during MLS Cup 2018 against the Portland Timbers. He came on as a substitute in the first minute of second-half stoppage time as Atlanta United won 2–0. Barco then won his second trophy with Atlanta United when the club won 3–2 over América in the Campeones Cup, coming on as a late second-half substitute. A couple of weeks later, on 27 August, Barco was a starter in the U.S. Open Cup final against Minnesota United, helping his side win 2–1.

=== River Plate ===
On 30 January 2022, Barco joined Argentine Primera División side River Plate on loan with an option to make the move permanent at the end of 2022 or 2023. On 10 February 2023 it was announced that Barco's loan to River Plate would become permanent on 1 January 2024.

=== Spartak Moscow ===
On 25 July 2024, Barco signed a three-year contract with Spartak Moscow in Russia. On 5 October 2026, Barco's contract with Spartak was extended to June 2030.

== Career statistics ==
=== Club ===
As of match played 8 November 2026

Appearances and goals by club, season and competition
Club	Season	League			National cup (Note: Includes Copa Argentina, U.S. Open Cup, Russian Cup)		Continental		Other		Total	
Club	Season	Division	Apps	Goals	Apps	Goals	Apps	Goals	Apps	Goals	Apps	Goals
Independiente	2016–17	Argentine Primera División	30	4	1	0	4	0	—		35	4
Independiente	2017–18	Argentine Primera División	8	1	2	0	12	3	—		22	4
Independiente	Total		38	5	3	0	16	3	—		57	8
Atlanta United	2018	Major League Soccer	26	4	2	1	—		5	0	33	5
Atlanta United	2019	Major League Soccer	15	4	3	0	5	0	3	0	26	4
Atlanta United	2020	Major League Soccer	15	2	—		4	0	—		19	2
Atlanta United	2021	Major League Soccer	25	7	—		3	1	1	0	29	8
Atlanta United	Total		81	17	5	1	12	1	9	0	107	19
River Plate (loan)	2022	Argentine Primera División	35	3	3	0	7	2	—		45	5
River Plate (loan)	2023	Argentine Primera División	41	7	2	0	3	1	1 (Note: Appearance in Trofeo de Campeones de la Liga Profesional)	0	47	8
River Plate	2024	Argentine Primera División	20	1	2	0	6	0	1 (Note: Appearance in Supercopa Argentina)	0	29	1
River Plate	Total		96	11	7	0	16	3	2	0	121	14
Spartak Moscow	2024–25	Russian Premier League	27	12	9	2	—		—		36	14
Spartak Moscow	2025–26	Russian Premier League	29	8	8	0	—		—		37	8
Spartak Moscow	2026–27	Russian Premier League	10	2	1	0	—		1 (Note: Appearance in Russian Super Cup)	0	12	2
Spartak Moscow	Total		66	22	18	2	—		1	0	85	24
Career total			281	55	33	3	44	7	12	0	370	65

== Honours ==
Independiente

- Copa Sudamericana: 2017

Atlanta United

- MLS Cup: 2018
- U.S. Open Cup: 2019
- Campeones Cup: 2019

River Plate

- Argentine Primera División: 2023
- Trofeo de Campeones: 2023
- Supercopa Argentina: 2023

Spartak Moscow

- Russian Cup: 2025–26

Individual

- MLS All-Star: 2018, 2019
- Russian Premier League Player of the Month: March 2026.
