= George Bello =

American soccer player (born 2002)

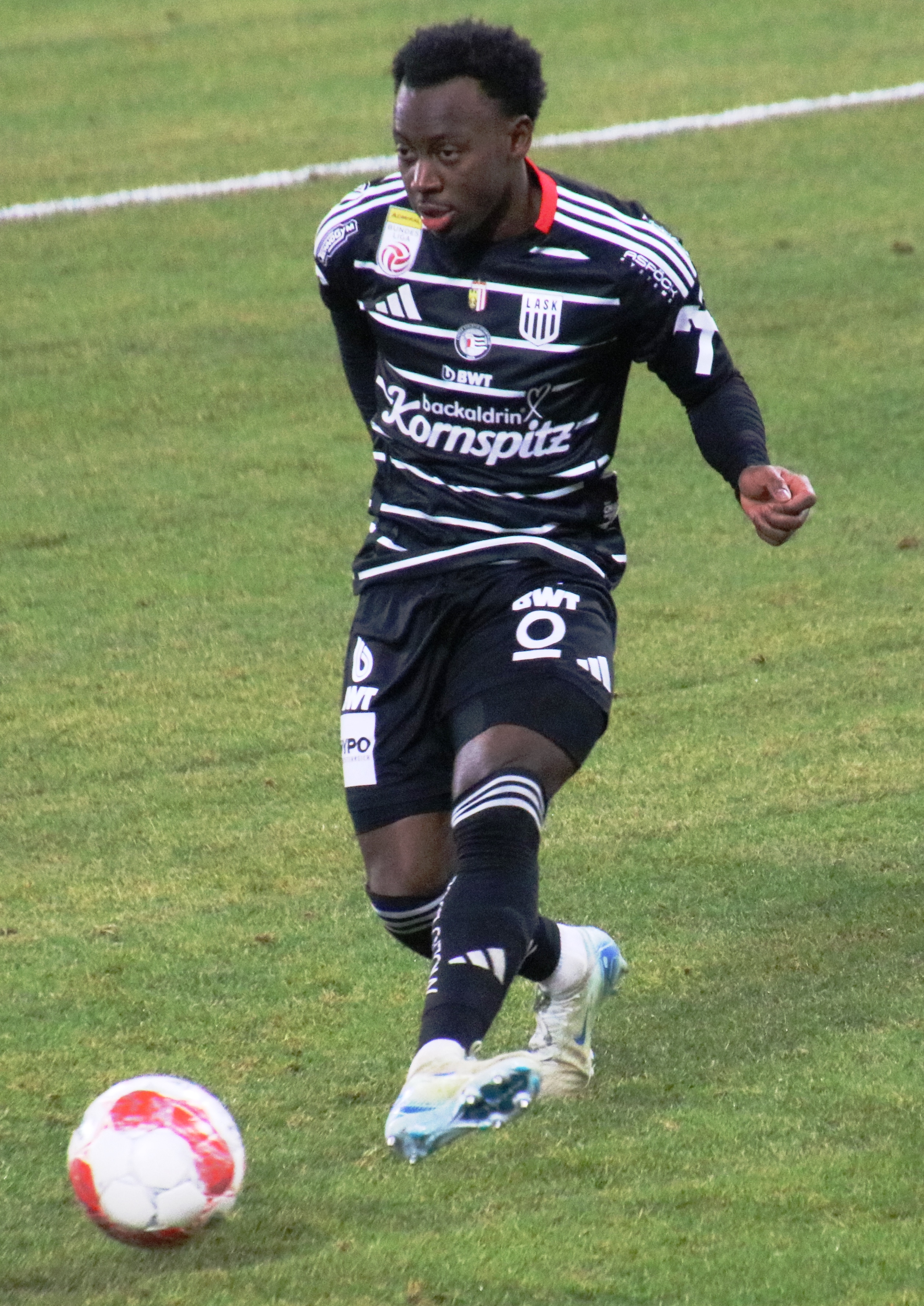
- Bello with LASK in 2024

Personal information
- Full name: George Oluwaseun Bello
- Date of birth: January 22, 2002 (age 24)
- Place of birth: Abuja, Nigeria
- Height: 5 ft 8 in (1.73 m)
- Position: Left-back

Team information
- Current team: LASK
- Number: 2

Youth career
- –2011: Southern Soccer Academy
- 2011–2016: Alpharetta Ambush
- 2016–2018: Atlanta United

Senior career*
Years	Team	Apps	(Gls)
2018–2020	Atlanta United 2	19	(1)
2018–2021	Atlanta United	52	(3)
2022–2023	Arminia Bielefeld	31	(0)
2023–	LASK	88	(2)

International career
2017	United States U15	5	(0)
2017–2019	United States U17	7	(1)
2021–2022	United States	7	(0)
Medal record
Representing United States
Winner	CONCACAF Gold Cup	2021
- * Club domestic league appearances and goals as of October 11, 2026

George Oluwaseun Bello (born January 22, 2002) is a professional soccer player who plays as a left-back for Austrian Bundesliga club LASK. Born in Nigeria, he has played for the United States national team.

== Early years ==
Born in Abuja, Nigeria, Bello moved with his family to Douglasville, Georgia, when he was a year old. During his early career, he played for Southern Soccer Academy, a youth soccer club affiliated with English club Chelsea, and the Alpharetta Ambush, where he played for five years. While playing at Alpharetta Ambush, he played with future Atlanta United academy teammate Zyen Jones.

After spending five years with the Alpharetta Ambush, Bello moved to the academy side at Atlanta United FC, a new expansion club for Major League Soccer. His former coach, Tony Annan, now at Atlanta United as their academy director, was the one to reach out to Bello to join his side.

In 2017, a couple of months after signing a professional contract with Atlanta United FC, Bello helped Atlanta United's under-16 side win the U.S. Soccer Development Academy U16 Championship. His performance during the season saw him named 2016–17 East Conference U15/16 Player of the Year and also included in the East Conference U15/16 Best XI.

== Club career ==
=== Atlanta United ===
On June 17, 2017, Bello, alongside teammates Lagos Kunga and Patrick Okonkwo, was signed by Atlanta United FC to a homegrown player contract which would start in 2018. He made his professional debut on March 31, 2018, for Atlanta United 2, the club's reserve team, against Charlotte Independence. He started and played the whole match in a 2–2 draw.

On September 2, 2018, Bello made his debut for the Atlanta United FC senior side in their Major League Soccer match against D.C. United. He came on as a 76th-minute substitute for Héctor Villalba as Atlanta United FC were defeated 3–1. He scored his first professional goal a month later on October 6 against the New England Revolution. He scored his team's opening goal in the 17th minute of a 2–1 Atlanta United FC victory. During the 2018 MLS Playoffs, Bello featured for Atlanta United FC twice from the bench but did not play as Atlanta United FC won the 2018 MLS Cup.

The next season, Bello made his international club debut for Atlanta United FC in the CONCACAF Champions League against Herediano on February 21. He started as a left-wide back as Atlanta United FC were defeated 3–1. In May 2019, it was confirmed that he would miss two to three months of the season with an injury to his right adductor. Returning in August, Bello went on to only play 12 matches with Atlanta United 2 in the USL Championship and none with Atlanta United FC during the 2019 season.

=== Arminia Bielefeld ===
On January 31, 2022, Bello joined German Bundesliga side Arminia Bielefeld on a four-and-a-half-year contract for an undisclosed fee.

=== LASK ===
On July 14, 2023, Bello signed a contract as a free agent for Austrian Bundesliga side LASK until 2026.

== International career ==
Bello has represented the United States at both the under-15 and under-17 level. He was part of the under-15 squad that won the Torneo Delle Nazioni in 2017. The United States won every match in which he started. On October 10, 2019, he was named in the under-17 squad for the FIFA U-17 World Cup.

In January 2021, Bello was called into the United States national team for their friendly against Trinidad and Tobago. He made his debut in the match on January 31, coming on as a 64th-minute substitute in the 7–0 victory. On July 17, 2021, he was named by head coach Gregg Berhalter into the 23-man squad for the 2021 CONCACAF Gold Cup. He started in two matches for the United States as they made it into the final against Mexico. Bello was named as a starter for the match and played 65 minutes as the United States won 1–0 after extra-time.

== Personal life ==
Bello is named after his grandfather, Georgie. His father was an amateur player in Nigeria and helped Bello develop his interest in the game. Bello also ran track and field in high school and helped his school win the 2016 Georgia team state championship. His favorite soccer players growing up were Neymar and Lionel Messi but he also was interested in the left back position and watched videos of David Alaba and Marcelo.

== Career statistics ==
=== Club ===
As of match played October 11, 2026

Appearances and goals by club, season and competition
Club	Season	League			National cup (Note: Includes DFB-Pokal, Austrian Cup)		Continental		Other		Total	
Club	Season	Division	Apps	Goals	Apps	Goals	Apps	Goals	Apps	Goals	Apps	Goals
Atlanta United 2	2018	United Soccer League	6	0	–		–		–		6	0
Atlanta United 2	2019	USL	12	1	–		–		–		12	0
Atlanta United 2	2020	USL	1	0	–		–		–		1	0
Atlanta United 2	Total		19	1	–		–		–		19	1
Atlanta United	2018	MLS	3	1	–		–		–		3	1
Atlanta United	2019	MLS	–		0	0	1 (Note: Appearance(s) in CONCACAF Champions League)	0	–		1	0
Atlanta United	2020	MLS	20 (Note: Includes two appearances in MLS is Back Tournament group stage)	1	–		1	0	–		21	1
Atlanta United	2021	MLS	29	1	–		4	0	1 (Note: Appearance in MLS Cup Playoffs)	0	34	1
Atlanta United	Total		52	3	–		6	0	1	0	59	3
Arminia Bielefeld	2021–22	Bundesliga	10	0	–		–		–		10	0
Arminia Bielefeld	2022–23	2. Bundesliga	21	0	2	0	–		2	0	25	0
Arminia Bielefeld	Total		31	0	2	0	–		2	0	35	0
LASK	2023–24	Austrian Bundesliga	24	0	3	0	6 (Note: Appearances in UEFA Europa League)	0	–		33	0
LASK	2024–25	Austrian Bundesliga	29	1	5	1	8 (Note: Two appearances in UEFA Europa League, six appearances in UEFA Conference League)	0	–		42	2
LASK	2025–26	Austrian Bundesliga	27	1	5	2	0	0	–		32	3
LASK	2026–27	Austrian Bundesliga	8	0	1	0	3 (Note: Appearances in UEFA Champions League)	0	–		12	0
LASK	Total		88	2	14	3	17	0	0	0	119	5
Career total			190	6	16	3	23	0	3	0	232	9

=== International ===
Appearances and goals by national team and year
National team	Year	Apps	Goals
United States	2021	6	0
United States	2022	1	0
Total		7	0

== Honors ==
Atlanta United

- MLS Cup: 2018
- U.S. Open Cup: 2019
- Campeones Cup: 2019

LASK

- Austrian Bundesliga: 2025–26
- Austrian Cup: 2025–26

United States

- CONCACAF Gold Cup: 2021

Individual

- MLS All-Star: 2021
