= Matheus Rossetto =

Brazilian footballer

Personal information
- Full name: Matheus Rossetto
- Date of birth: 3 June 1996 (age 30)
- Place of birth: Santo Amaro da Imperatriz, Brazil
- Height: 1.80 m (5 ft 11 in)
- Position: Midfielder

Team information
- Current team: Melbourne City (on loan from Fortaleza)
- Number: 5

Youth career
- 2009–2016: Atlético Paranaense

Senior career*
| Years | Team | Apps | (Gls) |
| 2015–2020 | Athletico Paranaense | 71 | (5) |
| 2016 | → Ferroviária (loan) | 10 | (1) |
| 2020–2023 | Atlanta United | 90 | (1) |
| 2021 | → Atlanta United 2 (loan) | 2 | (0) |
| 2024– | Fortaleza | 45 | (0) |
| 2026– | → Melbourne City (loan) | 1 | (1) |
- * Club domestic league appearances and goals as of 17 November 2026

Matheus Rossetto (born 3 June 1996) is a Brazilian professional footballer who plays as a midfielder for Melbourne City, on loan from Fortaleza.

== Club career ==
Born in Santo Amaro da Imperatriz, Santa Catarina, Rossetto joined Atlético Paranaense's youth setup in 2009, aged 12. He made his first team debut on 2 May 2015, coming on as a half-time substitute for goalscorer Nikão in a 5–0 Campeonato Paranaense home routing of Nacional.

On 15 December 2015 Rossetto was loaned to Ferroviária, along with other Atlético teammates. He scored his first senior goal on 25 February of the following year, netting his team's first in a 2–3 away loss against Ituano.

Returning to Furacão in May 2016, Rossetto made his Série A on 30 July by replacing Juninho in a 0–2 loss at Sport. He scored his first top flight goal on 5 October, netting the last in a 3–1 home win against Chapecoense; two days later, he renewed his contract until 2020.

On 3 February 2020, Rossetto joined Major League Soccer side Atlanta United.

== Career statistics ==
=== Club ===
As of match played 8 November 2020

Appearances and goals by club, season and competition
| Club | Season | League | | | State League | | National Cup | | Continental | | Other | | Total | |
| Club | Season | Division | Apps | Goals | Apps | Goals | Apps | Goals | Apps | Goals | Apps | Goals | Apps | Goals |
|---|---|---|---|---|---|---|---|---|---|---|---|---|---|---|
| Athletico Paranaense | 2015 | Serie A | — | | 1 (Note: Appearance(s) in Campeonato Paranaense) | 0 | — | | — | | — | | 1 | 0 |
| Athletico Paranaense | 2016 | Serie A | 15 | 2 | — | | — | | — | | — | | 15 | 2 |
| Athletico Paranaense | 2017 | Serie A | 31 | 1 | 13 | 1 | 4 | 0 | 11 (Note: Appearance(s) in Copa Libertadores) | 0 | — | | 59 | 2 |
| Athletico Paranaense | 2018 | Serie A | 18 | 2 | — | | 7 | 0 | 3 (Note: Appearance(s) in Copa Sudamericana) | 0 | — | | 28 | 2 |
| Athletico Paranaense | 2019 | Serie A | 7 | 0 | 3 | 1 | — | | 0 | 0 | 0 (Note: Appearance(s) in Recopa Sudamericana) | 0 | 10 | 1 |
| Athletico Paranaense | Total | | 71 | 5 | 17 | 2 | 11 | 0 | 14 | 0 | 0 | 0 | 113 | 7 |
| Ferroviária (loan) | 2016 | Paulista | — | | 10 | 1 | 1 | 0 | — | | — | | 11 | 1 |
| Atlanta United | 2020 | Major League Soccer | 15 | 0 | — | | — | | 2 (Note: Appearance(s) in CONCACAF Champions League) | 0 | — | | 17 | 0 |
| Career total | | | 86 | 5 | 27 | 3 | 12 | 0 | 16 | 0 | 0 | 0 | 141 | 8 |

== Honours ==
Athletico Paranaense

- Copa do Brasil: 2019
- Campeonato Paranaense: 2019
- Copa Sudamericana: 2018
- J.League Cup / Copa Sudamericana Championship: 2019

Fortaleza

- Copa do Nordeste: 2024
- Campeonato Cearense: 2026
