= Eric Remedi =

Argentine association football player

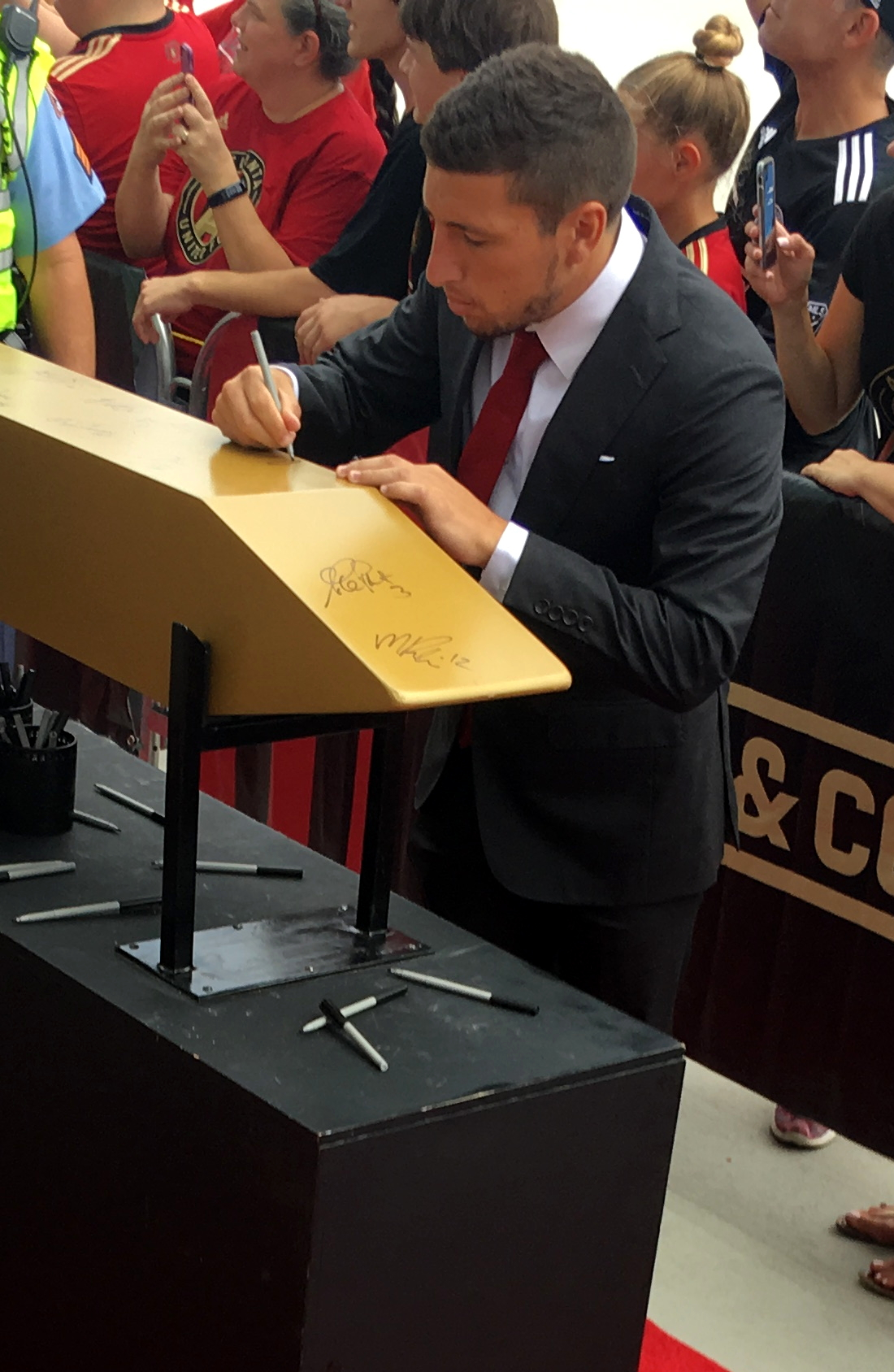
- Remedi at an Atlanta United event in 2018

Personal information
- Full name: Eric Daian Remedi
- Date of birth: 4 June 1995 (age 31)
- Place of birth: Paraná, Argentina
- Height: 1.69 m (5 ft 6 1/2 in)
- Position: Defensive midfielder

Team information
- Current team: Peñarol
- Number: 29

Youth career
- Palermo de Paraná
- Belgrano de Paraná
- Banfield

Senior career*
Years	Team	Apps	(Gls)
2015–2018	Banfield	55	(0)
2018–2021	Atlanta United	59	(1)
2021–2022	San Jose Earthquakes	54	(0)
2023	Banfield	38	(0)
2024	San Lorenzo	25	(0)
2025–	Peñarol	25	(1)
- * Club domestic league appearances and goals as of 1 October 2025

Eric Daian Remedi (born 4 June 1995) is an Argentine professional footballer who plays as a defensive midfielder for Uruguayan Primera División club Peñarol.

== Career ==
=== Banfield ===
Remedi's senior career started in 2015 with Argentine Primera División side Banfield, a club who signed him at the age of fifteen after the player had youth spells with Palermo de Paraná and Belgrano de Paraná. His first appearance for the club came on 6 June during a goalless draw against Sarmiento under the guidance of manager Matías Almeyda. On 24 August 2016, Remedi made his Copa Sudamericana debut against San Lorenzo. He remained with El Taladro for three years and made sixty-five appearances in all competitions, with his final appearance arriving on 12 May 2018 during a goalless draw away to Patronato.

=== Atlanta United ===
In June 2018, Remedi headed abroad to join Atlanta United of Major League Soccer. He made his debut on 21 July during a home victory against D.C. United. Remedi scored his first senior goal on 4 November, netting for Atlanta during a win over New York City in the MLS Cup Playoffs; which they'd win. His next goal came against Orlando City in a 2019 U.S. Open Cup semi-final, a competition that the club went on to win with Remedi playing the full duration of the final versus Minnesota United at Mercedes-Benz Stadium on 27 August. He departed Atlanta ahead of the 2021 campaign, having scored three goals in seventy-eight games.

=== San Jose Earthquakes ===
On 15 February 2021, Remedi was traded to the San Jose Earthquakes in exchange for $200,000 of 2022 General Allocation Money; with the potential to rise to $500,000. The move saw him reunite with Matías Almeyda, who gave Remedi his senior debut back in June 2015 for Banfield. After the 2022 season Remedi's contract option was declined by the Earthquakes, and so he left MLS and returned to Club Atlético Banfield.

== Career statistics ==
As of 3 December 2021

Club statistics
Club	Season	League			Cup		Continental		Other		Total	
Club	Season	Division	Apps	Goals	Apps	Goals	Apps	Goals	Apps	Goals	Apps	Goals
Banfield	2015	Primera División	4	0	1	0	—		0	0	5	0
Banfield	2016	Primera División	6	0	1	0	—		0	0	7	0
Banfield	2016–17	Primera División	24	0	1	0	1 (Note: Appearance(s) in the Copa Sudamericana)	0	0	0	26	0
Banfield	2017–18	Primera División	21	0	2	0	4 (Note: Appearance(s) in the Copa Libertadores)	0	0	0	27	0
Banfield	Total		55	0	5	0	5	0	0	0	65	0
Atlanta United	2018	MLS	13	0	0	0	—		5 (Note: Appearance(s) in the MLS Cup Playoffs)	1	18	1
Atlanta United	2019	MLS	28	0	5	1	4 (Note: Appearance(s) in the CONCACAF Champions League)	0	1	0	38	1
Atlanta United	2020	MLS	18	1	—		4	0	—		22	1
Atlanta United	Total		59	1	5	1	8	0	6	1	78	3
San Jose Earthquakes	2021	MLS	29	0	0	0	—		—		29	0
Career total			143	1	10	1	13	0	6	1	172	3

== Honours ==
Atlanta United

- MLS Cup: 2018
- U.S. Open Cup: 2019
