= Manuel Castro (footballer) =

Uruguayan footballer (born 1995)

Personal information
- Full name: Luis Manuel Castro Cáceres
- Date of birth: 27 September 1995 (age 31)
- Place of birth: Durazno, Uruguay
- Height: 1.72 m (5 ft 7 1/2 in)
- Position: Winger

Team information
- Current team: Juventude
- Number: 17

Youth career
- Montevideo Wanderers

Senior career*
Years	Team	Apps	(Gls)
2014–2019	Montevideo Wanderers	76	(17)
2019–2022	Estudiantes	63	(9)
2020	→ Atlanta United (loan)	9	(0)
2023–2025	Juárez	16	(2)
2025	Liverpool Montevideo	16	(1)
2026–	Juventude	27	(1)
- * Club domestic league appearances and goals as of 16 November 2026

Luis Manuel Castro Cáceres (born 27 September 1995) is a Uruguayan professional footballer who plays as a right winger for Juventude.

== Career ==
Castro's career started in his homeland with Montevideo Wanderers, manager Alfredo Arias promoted the midfielder into his first-team squad during the 2014–15 Uruguayan Primera División season. Having been an unused substitute for matches with El Tanque Sisley, Rampla Juniors and Tacuarembó, Castro made his first professional appearance in a 1–0 loss away to Sud América on 6 December 2014. That was his sole appearance that season, with just two more coming in 2015–16. Castro featured fifteen times in the next campaign, whilst scoring his first three senior goals; including his opener over Nacional in September 2016.

In total, Castro appeared in eighty-seven matches for Montevideo Wanderers across five years, a spell in which he netted seventeen goals; notably eleven of which came in 2018, which was his last season with the club. On 4 January 2019, Castro joined Argentine Primera División side Estudiantes; signing a three-year contract. After debuting in a home loss to Vélez Sarsfield on 28 January, he netted his first goal on 18 February against Argentinos Juniors. Further goals versus Talleres and, in the Copa Argentina, Sarmiento occurred across thirty total appearances in his first twelve months with Estudiantes.

Midway through Castro's second season with Estudiantes he joined Major League Soccer's Atlanta United on a six-month loan, with an option for the club to extend the deal for the rest of the season. He made his debut in the CONCACAF Champions League on 11 March as Atlanta lost 3–0 at the Estadio Azteca to América. The club, during the season's delay due to the COVID-19 pandemic, exercised their loan extension option on 29 June. After three appearances in the MLS is Back Tournament, Castro made his regular season bow in a win over Orlando City on 29 August. His loan ended on 24 November, after the winger had appeared eleven times; though just three were as a starter.

== Career statistics ==
As of 22 December 2020.

Club statistics
Club	Season	League			Cup		League Cup		Continental		Other		Total	
Club	Season	Division	Apps	Goals	Apps	Goals	Apps	Goals	Apps	Goals	Apps	Goals	Apps	Goals
Montevideo Wanderers	2014–15	Uruguayan Primera División	1	0	—		—		0	0	0	0	1	0
Montevideo Wanderers	2015–16	Uruguayan Primera División	2	0	—		—		—		0	0	2	0
Montevideo Wanderers	2016	Uruguayan Primera División	15	3	—		—		5 (Note: Appearance(s) in the Copa Sudamericana)	0	0	0	20	3
Montevideo Wanderers	2017	Uruguayan Primera División	25	3	—		—		4 (Note: Appearance(s) in the Copa Libertadores)	0	0	0	29	3
Montevideo Wanderers	2018	Uruguayan Primera División	33	11	—		—		2	0	0	0	35	11
Montevideo Wanderers	Total		76	17	—		—		11	0	0	0	87	17
Estudiantes	2018–19	Argentine Primera División	9	1	1	1	3	0	—		0	0	13	2
Estudiantes	2019–20	Argentine Primera División	14	1	3	0	0	0	—		0	0	17	1
Estudiantes	2020–21 (Note: Soccerway counts Copa de la Liga Profesional appearances as league appearances.)	Argentine Primera División	0	0	0	0	0	0	—		0	0	0	0
Estudiantes	Total		23	2	4	1	3	0	—		0	0	30	3
Atlanta United (loan)	2020	Major League Soccer	10	0	0	0	—		1 (Note: Appearance(s) in the CONCACAF Champions League)	0	0	0	11	0
Career total			109	19	4	1	3	0	12	0	0	0	128	20
