= Franco Escobar =

Argentine footballer (born 1995)

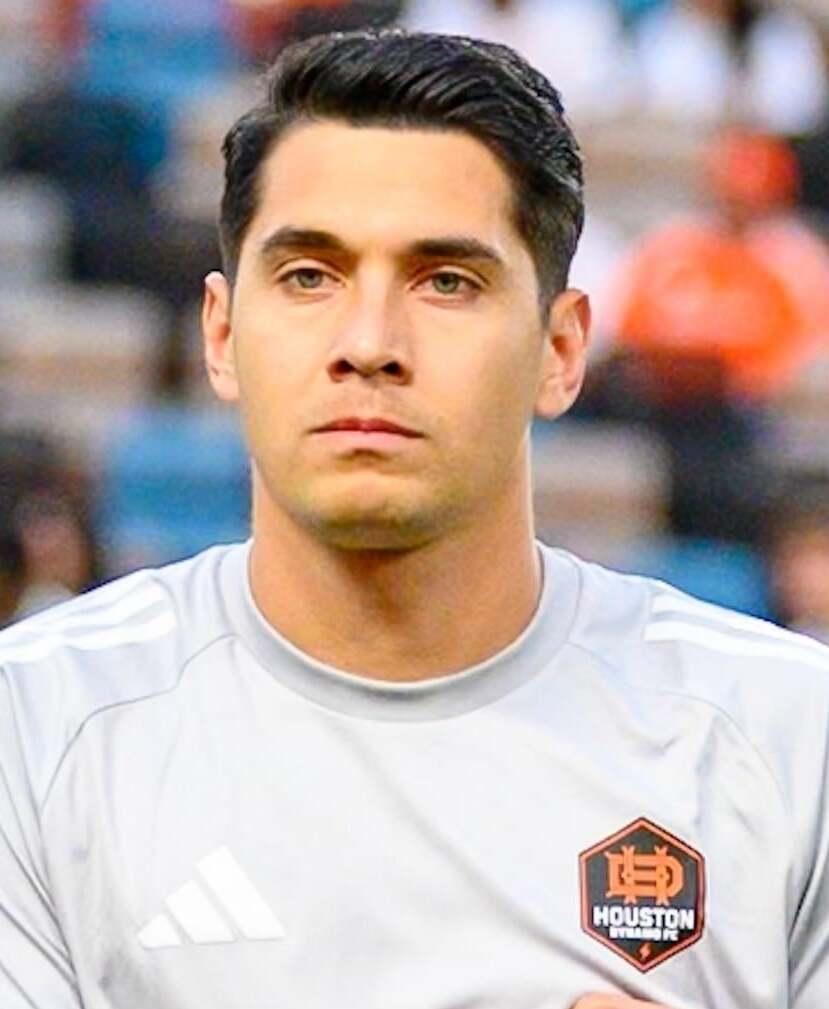
- Escobar with the Houston Dynamo in 2025

Personal information
- Full name: Franco Nicolás Escobar
- Date of birth: 21 February 1995 (age 31)
- Place of birth: Rosario, Santa Fe, Argentina
- Height: 1.70 m (5 ft 7 in)
- Position: Right-back

Team information
- Current team: Newell's Old Boys
- Number: 24

Youth career
- Newell's Old Boys

Senior career*
Years	Team	Apps	(Gls)
2015–2017	Newell's Old Boys	34	(0)
2018–2021	Atlanta United	63	(2)
2019	→ Atlanta United 2 (loan)	1	(0)
2021	→ Newell's Old Boys (loan)	7	(0)
2022	Los Angeles FC	19	(1)
2023–2025	Houston Dynamo	75	(6)
2026	Peñarol	14	(0)
2026–	Newell's Old Boys	1	(0)
- * Club domestic league appearances and goals as of 16:52, 26 July 2026 (UTC)

Franco Nicolás Escobar (born 21 February 1995) is an Argentine professional footballer who plays as a right-back for Newell's Old Boys.

== Club career ==
=== Newell's Old Boys ===
Escobar began his career in the Newell's Old Boys academy. He made his first team debut on 7 June 2015, getting the start against Boca Juniors in a 4–0 loss. He made 15 appearances during his debut season as Newell's finished 16th in the table. Escobar made 6 appearances during the 2016 season and 12 in the 2016–17 season, playing as both a rightback and a centerback. He made 2 appearance during the 2017–18 season prior to being sold.

=== Atlanta United ===
On 8 December 2017 Escobar signed with MLS side Atlanta United. On 3 March 2018 he made his debut for Atlanta, playing 90 minutes in a 4–0 loss to the Houston Dynamo in the opening match of the season. He suffered a concussion on 17 March in a 4–1 win over the Vancouver Whitecaps that would keep him out for the next 4 games. On 5 May, late in a 2–1 against the Chicago Fire, Escobar collided with Atlanta goalkeeper Brad Guzan and injured his chest. Escobar would miss the next 3 matches. He scored his first goal for Atlanta on 21 October, helping Atlanta to a 2–1 win over Chicago. Escobar finished the regular season with 22 appearances and 1 goal as Atlanta finished 2nd in the Eastern Conference. During Atlanta's playoff run, Escobar played every minute of the 5 games, scored 2 goals, and had an assist, including one in the final where Atlanta beat the Portland Timbers 2–0. He was named to the MLS Cup Playoffs Best XI.

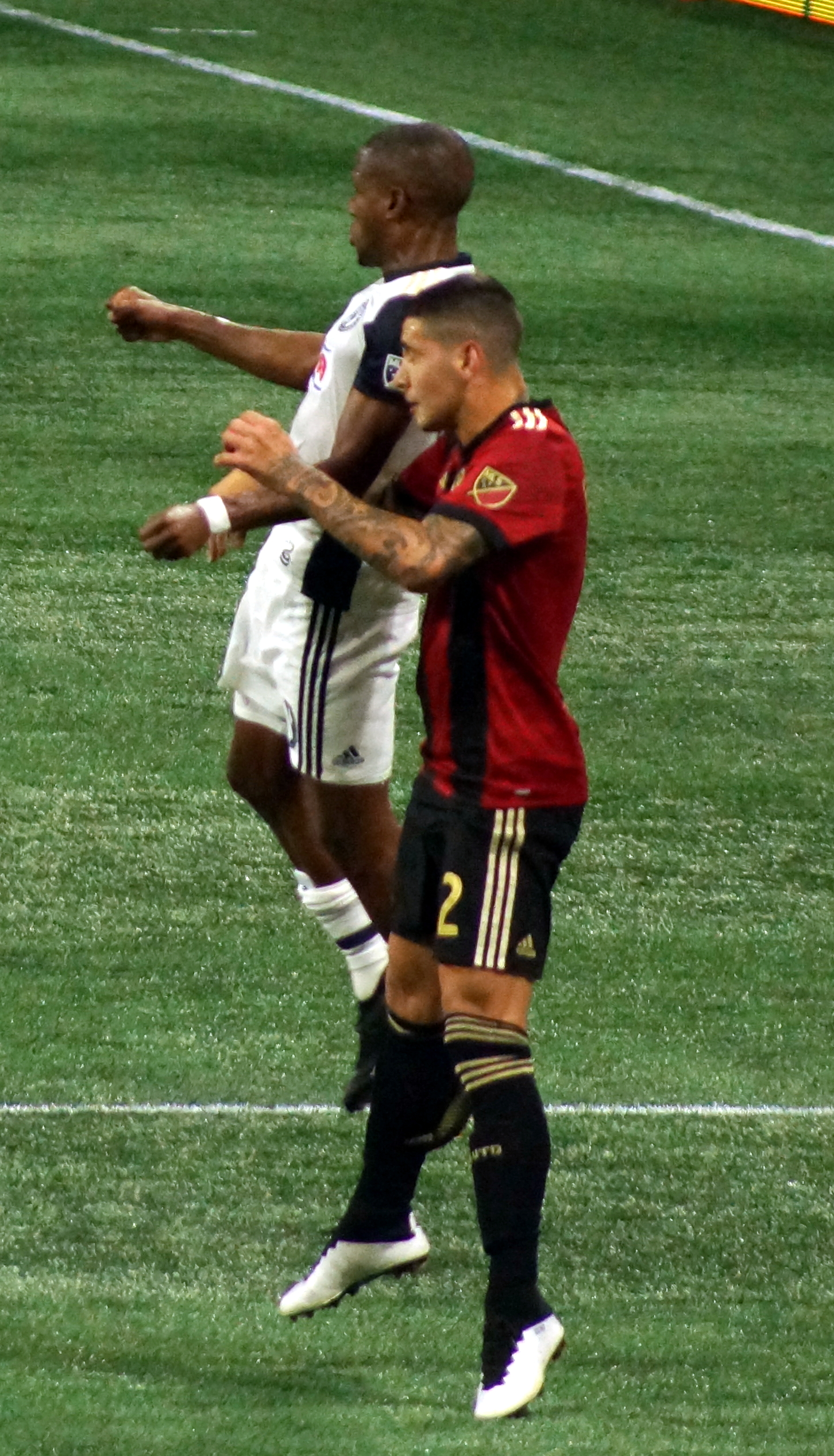
Franco Escobar playing for Atlanta United on June 2, 2018

On 16 January 2019, on the first day of preseason, Escobar suffered a fractured right clavicle. The injury forced him to miss all of Atlanta's CONCACAF Champions League matches as well as the first 3 games of the MLS season. After making an appearance for Atlanta United 2 to regain fitness, he made his first MLS match of the season in a 2–0 loss to the Columbus Crew on 30 March. Escobar ended the regular season with 1 goal and 3 assists in 25 appearances, helping Atlanta finish 2nd in the East. In the opening round of the playoffs, Escobar scored the lone goal to give Atlanta a 1–0 win over the New England Revolution. He played every minute of Atlanta's 3 playoff games, with the run ending in the Conference Finals following a 2–0 loss to Toronto FC. In the 2019 Campeones Cup, Atlanta beat Club América 3–2, but Escobar was forced out of the game due to injury.

In a shortened 2020 season due to the COVID-19 Pandemic, Escobar played in 16 of the 23 matches and had 2 assists. Atlanta finished the season 12th in the conference, missing the playoffs for the first time in team history. In CCL play, Escobar made 3 appearances as Atlanta fell to Club América in the quarterfinals 3–1 on aggregate.

==== Loan to Newell's Old Boys ====
On 9 February 2021, Escobar returned to Newell's Old Boys on a loan deal until 1 January 2022. On 16 February, Escobar broke his foot (fifth metatarsal) in training. He made his first appearance of the loan on 17 July, playing 58 minutes in a 3–2 win over Talleres de Córdoba. In Newell's next match, Escobar had to be subbed off due to pain in his foot. He would miss the next 18 matches. He recovered from his injury to play in the final 5 games the year, ending the season with 7 appearances.

=== Los Angeles FC ===
On 12 December 2021, Atlanta traded Escobar to Los Angeles FC in exchange for $600,000 in General Allocation Money. He made his LAFC debut on 26 February, playing the full match in a 3–0 win over the Colorado Rapids in the opening game of the season. On 6 March, LAFC drew 1–1 with the Portland Timbers, Escobar was forced off 13 minutes into the game with a calf injury that would keep him out for 6 games. He scored his first goal for LAFC on 7 May, his second game back from the injury, to give LAFC a 2–2 draw with the Philadelphia Union. Escobar missed another 4 MLS games plus an Open Cup game in May due to his calf. He also missed 3 games due to a concussion at the end of the season. Escobar ended the season with 1 goal and 1 assist in 19 regular season appearances, helping LAFC win the Supporters' Shield. He made just one appearance in the playoffs, coming on as a late sub in a 3–0 win over Austin FC in the conference final. LAFC would go onto win MLS Cup 2022 3–0 on penalties against Philadelphia.

Escobar's contract expired following the 2022 season.

=== Houston Dynamo ===
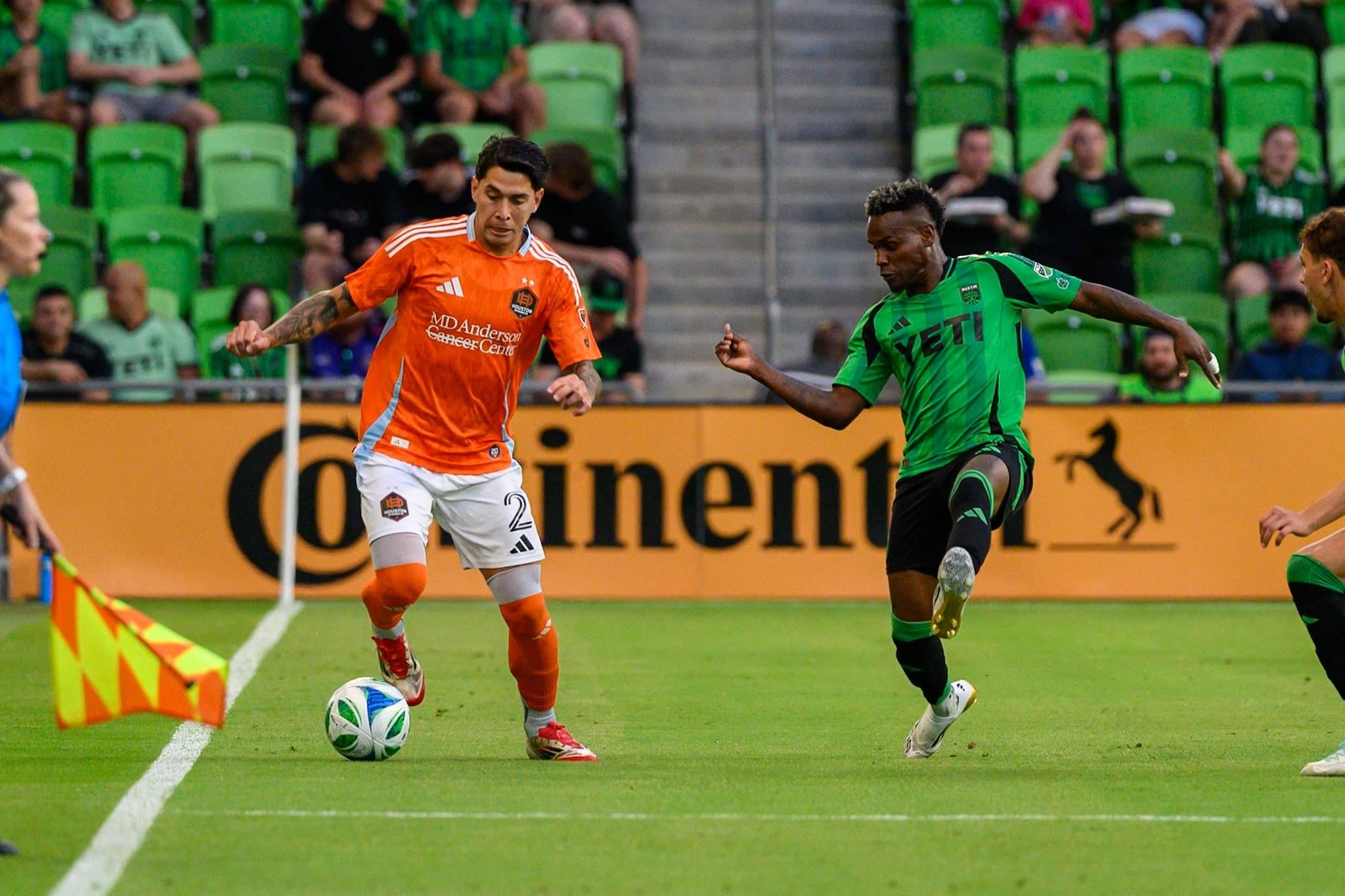
Escobar during the 2025 U.S. Open Cup.

On 12 January 2023, Escobar signed with the Houston Dynamo. Houston declined his contract option following the 2025 season.

==== Penarol ====
On 1 January 2026, Franco Escobar signed for Peñarol and a 1-year contract with the club.

== Career statistics ==
=== Club ===
As of match played 15 February 2023

Appearances and goals by club, season and competition
Club	Season	League			National Cup (Note: Includes Copa Argentina and U.S. Open Cup)		League Cup (Note: Includes MLS Cup Playoffs and Copa de la Liga Profesional)		Continental		Other		Total	
Club	Season	Division	Apps	Goals	Apps	Goals	Apps	Goals	Apps	Goals	Apps	Goals	Apps	Goals
Newell's Old Boys	2015	Primera División	15	0	0	0	—		—		—		15	0
Newell's Old Boys	2016	Primera División	6	0	0	0	—		—		—		6	0
Newell's Old Boys	2016–17	Primera División	12	0	0	0	—		—		—		12	0
Newell's Old Boys	2017–18	Primera División	1	0	1	0	—		0	0	—		2	0
Newell's Old Boys	Total		34	0	1	0	0	0	0	0	0	0	35	0
Atlanta United	2018	Major League Soccer	22	1	1	0	5	2	—		—		28	3
Atlanta United	2019	Major League Soccer	25	1	5	0	3	1	0	0	1 (Note: Appearances in Campeones Cup)	0	34	2
Atlanta United	2020	Major League Soccer	16 (Note: Includes three appearances in the MLS is Back Tournament group stage)	0	—		—		3 (Note: Appearances in CONCACAF Champions League)	0	—		19	0
Atlanta United	Total		63	2	6	0	8	3	3	0	1	0	81	5
Atlanta United 2 (loan)	2019	USL Championship	1	0	—		—		—		—		1	0
Newell's Old Boys (loan)	2021	Primera División	7	0	—		0	0	0	0	—		7	0
LAFC	2022	Major League Soccer	19	1	2	0	1	0	—		—		22	1
Houston Dynamo	2023	Major League Soccer	0	0	0	0	0	0	0	0	—		0	0
Career total			124	3	9	0	9	3	3	0	1	0	146	6

== Honours ==
Atlanta United

- MLS Cup: 2018
- U.S. Open Cup: 2019
- Campeones Cup: 2019

Los Angeles FC

- Supporters' Shield: 2022
- MLS Cup: 2022

Houston Dynamo

- U.S. Open Cup: 2023

== Personal life ==
Escobar obtained a green card in 2020, classifying him as a domestic player for MLS roster purposes.
