= 2018 MLS Cup playoffs =

2018 edition of the MLS playoffs

Tournament details
- Country: United States
- Dates: October 31 – December 8
- Teams: 12

Final positions
- Champions: Atlanta United FC (1st title)
- Runners-up: Portland Timbers
- Semifinalists: New York Red Bulls; Sporting Kansas City

Tournament statistics
- Matches played: 17
- Goals scored: 52 (3.06 per match)
- Attendance: 494,421 (29,084 per match)
- Top goal scorer(s): (Venezuela) Josef Martínez (Argentina) Diego Valeri (4 goals each)

The 2018 MLS Cup playoffs (branded as the Audi 2018 MLS Cup Playoffs for sponsorship reasons) began on October 31 and ended on December 8 with MLS Cup 2018, the 23rd league championship match for MLS. This was the 23rd version of the MLS Cup playoffs, the tournament culminating the Major League Soccer regular season. Twelve teams, the top six of each conference, competed in the MLS Cup playoffs.

The first round of each conference had the third-seeded team hosting the sixth seed while the fourth-seed hosted the fifth seed in a single match, to determine who advanced to the conference semifinals. In the conference semifinals, the top seed played the lowest remaining seed, while the second played the next-lowest. The winners advanced to the conference finals. Both the conference semifinals and conference finals were played as a two-legged aggregate series, with the higher-seed hosting the second leg. The winners advanced to the MLS Cup, a single match hosted by the participant with the better regular season record.

Toronto FC were the defending MLS Cup champions, but failed to qualify for the playoffs.

Atlanta United FC won their first MLS Cup title, defeating the Portland Timbers 2–0 in MLS Cup, held at the Mercedes-Benz Stadium in Atlanta, Georgia.

== Qualified teams ==
Eastern Conference

- Atlanta United FC
- Columbus Crew SC
- D.C. United
- New York City FC
- New York Red Bulls
- Philadelphia Union

Western Conference

- FC Dallas
- Los Angeles FC
- Portland Timbers
- Real Salt Lake
- Seattle Sounders FC
- Sporting Kansas City

== Conference standings ==
The top six teams from each conference advanced to the MLS Cup playoffs.

Eastern Conference

Pos	Team	Pld	Pts
1	New York Red Bulls	34	71
2	Atlanta United FC	34	69
3	New York City FC	34	56
4	D.C. United	34	51
5	Columbus Crew	34	51
6	Philadelphia Union	34	50
7	Montreal Impact	34	46
8	New England Revolution	34	41
9	Toronto FC	34	36
10	Chicago Fire	34	32
11	Orlando City SC	34	28

Source: MLS

Western Conference

Pos	Team	Pld	Pts
1	Sporting Kansas City	34	62
2	Seattle Sounders FC	34	59
3	Los Angeles FC	34	57
4	FC Dallas	34	57
5	Portland Timbers	34	54
6	Real Salt Lake	34	49
7	LA Galaxy	34	48
8	Vancouver Whitecaps FC	34	47
9	Houston Dynamo	34	38
10	Minnesota United FC	34	36
11	Colorado Rapids	34	31
12	San Jose Earthquakes	34	21

Source: MLS

== Bracket ==
Knockout round	Conference semifinals
E3	New York City FC	0	1	1
10/31 – New York City, New York
E2	Atlanta United FC	1	3	4
E3	New York City FC	3
E6	Philadelphia Union	1
Eastern Conference
E5	Columbus Crew	1	0	1
11/1 – Washington, D.C.
E1	New York Red Bulls	0	3	3
E4	D.C. United	2 (2)
E5	Columbus Crew (p)	2 (3)
W5	Portland Timbers (p)	2	2	4 (4)
10/31 – Frisco, Texas
W2	Seattle Sounders FC	1	3	4 (2)
W4	FC Dallas	1
W5	Portland Timbers	2
Western Conference
W6	Real Salt Lake	1	2	3
11/1 – Los Angeles, California
W1	Sporting Kansas City	1	4	5
W3	Los Angeles FC	2
W6	Real Salt Lake	3

Conference finals
E2	Atlanta United FC	3	0	3
E1	New York Red Bulls	0	1	1
W5	Portland Timbers	0	3	3
W1	Sporting Kansas City	0	2	2

MLS Cup; December 8 – Atlanta, Georgia
E2	Atlanta United FC	2
W5	Portland Timbers	0

== Knockout round ==
=== Summary ===
Team 1	Score	Team 2
Eastern Conference
New York City FC (E3)	3–1	Philadelphia Union (E6)
D.C. United (E4)	2–2 (a.e.t.) (2–3 p)	Columbus Crew SC (E5)
Western Conference
Los Angeles FC (W3)	2–3	Real Salt Lake (W6)
FC Dallas (W4)	1–2	Portland Timbers (W5)

=== Eastern Conference ===
October 31
7:00 pm EDT

New York City FC	3–1	Philadelphia Union
Tajouri-Shradi 10'; Villa 26'; Moralez 78'	Report	Burke 83'

Yankee Stadium, New York City, New York
Attendance: 15,153
Referee: Robert Sibiga

November 1
8:00 pm EDT

D.C. United	2–2 (a.e.t.)	Columbus Crew SC
Brillant 21'; DeLeon 116'	Report	Higuaín 30', 96'
Penalties
Rooney (penalty missed); Asad (penalty scored); Stieber (penalty scored); Acosta (penalty missed); DeLeon (penalty missed)	2–3	(penalty scored) Higuaín; (penalty scored) Trapp; (penalty missed) Zardes; (penalty scored) Hansen; (penalty missed) Mullins

Audi Field, Washington, D.C.
Attendance: 20,600
Referee: Allen Chapman

=== Western Conference ===
October 31
8:30 pm CDT

FC Dallas	1–2	Portland Timbers
Hedges 90+4'	Report	Valeri 23', 71'

Toyota Stadium, Frisco, Texas
Attendance: 10,297
Referee: Alan Kelly

November 1
7:30 pm PDT

Los Angeles FC	2–3	Real Salt Lake
Danilo Silva 31'; Ramirez 54'	Report	Kreilach 21', 58'; Zimmerman 69' (o.g.)

Banc of California Stadium, Los Angeles, California
Attendance: 22,000
Referee: Mark Geiger

== Conference semifinals ==
=== Summary ===
Team 1	Agg.	Team 2	1st leg	2nd leg
Eastern Conference
Columbus Crew SC (E5)	1–3	New York Red Bulls (E1)	1–0	0–3
New York City FC (E3)	1–4	Atlanta United FC (E2)	0–1	1–3
Western Conference
Real Salt Lake (W6)	3–5	Sporting Kansas City (W1)	1–1	2–4
Portland Timbers (W5)	4–4 (4–2 p)	Seattle Sounders FC (W2)	2–1	2–3 (a.e.t.)

=== Eastern Conference ===
November 4
3:00 pm EST

Columbus Crew SC	1–0	New York Red Bulls
Zardes 61'	Report

Mapfre Stadium, Columbus, Ohio
Attendance: 12,892
Referee: Nima Saghafi
November 11
7:30 pm EST

New York Red Bulls	3–0	Columbus Crew SC
Muyl 17'; Royer 73', 76'	Report

Red Bull Arena, Harrison, New Jersey
Attendance: 22,789
Referee: Alan Kelly

New York Red Bulls won 3–1 on aggregate.

November 4
7:30 pm EST

New York City FC	0–1	Atlanta United FC
	Report	Remedi 37'

Yankee Stadium, New York City, New York
Attendance: 19,198
Referee: Kevin Stott
November 11
5:30 pm EST

Atlanta United FC	3–1	New York City FC
Martínez 25' (pen.), 83'; Almirón 42'	Report	Chanot 45'

Mercedes-Benz Stadium, Atlanta, Georgia
Attendance: 70,526
Referee: Mark Geiger

Atlanta United FC won 4–1 on aggregate.

=== Western Conference ===
November 4
2:30 pm PST

Portland Timbers	2–1	Seattle Sounders FC
Ebobisse 17'; Blanco 29'	Report	Ruidíaz 10'

Providence Park, Portland, Oregon
Attendance: 21,144
Referee: Ted Unkel
November 8
7:30 pm PST

Seattle Sounders FC	3–2 (a.e.t.)	Portland Timbers
Ruidíaz 68', 90+3'; Lodeiro 97' (pen.)	Report	Blanco 78'; Asprilla 93'
Penalties
Ruidíaz (penalty scored); Bruin (penalty missed); Alonso (penalty missed); Bwana (penalty scored)	2–4	(penalty scored) Melano; (penalty scored) Valeri; (penalty scored) Blanco; (penalty missed) Ridgewell; (penalty scored) Asprilla

CenturyLink Field, Seattle, Washington
Attendance: 39,452
Referee: Jair Marrufo

4–4 on aggregate. Portland Timbers won 4–2 on penalties.

November 4
8:00 pm MST

Real Salt Lake	1–1	Sporting Kansas City
Rusnák 51'	Report	Rubio 60'

Rio Tinto Stadium, Sandy, Utah
Attendance: 14,045
Referee: Baldomero Toledo
November 11
2:00 pm CST

Sporting Kansas City	4–2	Real Salt Lake
Rubio 14'; Sallói 19', 90+7'; Ilie 67' (pen.)	Report	Saucedo 60'; Kreilach 72'

Children's Mercy Park, Kansas City, Kansas
Attendance: 19,918
Referee: José Carlos Rivero

Sporting Kansas City won 5–3 on aggregate.

== Conference finals ==
=== Summary ===
Team 1	Agg.	Team 2	1st leg	2nd leg
Eastern Conference
Atlanta United FC (E2)	3–1	New York Red Bulls (E1)	3–0	0–1
Western Conference
Portland Timbers (W5)	3–2	Sporting Kansas City (W1)	0–0	3–2

=== Eastern Conference ===
November 25
5:00 pm EST

Atlanta United FC	3–0	New York Red Bulls
Martínez 32'; Escobar 71'; Villalba 90+5'	Report

Mercedes-Benz Stadium, Atlanta, Georgia
Attendance: 70,016
Referee: Kevin Stott
November 29
7:30 pm EST

New York Red Bulls	1–0	Atlanta United FC
Parker 90+4'	Report

Red Bull Arena, Harrison, New Jersey
Attendance: 22,137
Referee: Jair Marrufo

Atlanta United FC won 3–1 on aggregate.

=== Western Conference ===
November 25
4:30 pm PST

Portland Timbers	0–0	Sporting Kansas City
	Report

Providence Park, Portland, Oregon
Attendance: 21,144
Referee: Robert Sibiga
November 29
8:30 pm CST

Sporting Kansas City	2–3	Portland Timbers
Sallói 20'; Gerso 81'	Report	Blanco 52'; Valeri 61', 90+9'

Children's Mercy Park, Kansas City, Kansas
Attendance: 20,091
Referee: Mark Geiger

Portland Timbers won 3–2 on aggregate.

== MLS Cup 2018 ==
December 8, 2018
8:00 p.m. EST

Atlanta United FC	2–0	Portland Timbers
Martínez 39'; Escobar 54'	Report

Mercedes-Benz Stadium, Atlanta, Georgia
Attendance: 73,019
Referee: Alan Kelly

== Statistics ==
=== Top goalscorers ===
Rank	Player	Club	Goals
1	(Venezuela) Josef Martínez	Atlanta United FC	4
1	(Argentina) Diego Valeri	Portland Timbers	4
3	(Argentina) Sebastián Blanco	Portland Timbers	3
3	(Croatia) Damir Kreilach	Real Salt Lake	3
3	(Peru) Raúl Ruidíaz	Seattle Sounders FC	3
3	(Hungary) Dániel Sallói	Sporting Kansas City	3
7	(Argentina) Franco Escobar	Atlanta United FC	2
7	(Argentina) Federico Higuaín	Columbus Crew SC	2
7	(Austria) Daniel Royer	New York Red Bulls	2
7	(Chile) Diego Rubio	Sporting Kansas City	2

=== Best XI ===
The following players were chosen as the best eleven of the 2018 playoffs.

Goalkeeper	Defenders	Midfielders	Forwards
(United States) Jeff Attinella (POR)	(United States) Aaron Long (NYR) (United States) Matt Besler (SKC) (Argentina) Leandro González Pírez (ATL) (Argentina) Franco Escobar (ATL)	(Argentina) Sebastián Blanco (POR) (Paraguay) Miguel Almirón (ATL) (Colombia) Diego Chará (POR) (Argentina) Diego Valeri (POR)	(Venezuela) Josef Martínez (ATL) (Scotland) Johnny Russell (SKC)
