= Emerson Hyndman =

American soccer player (born 1996)

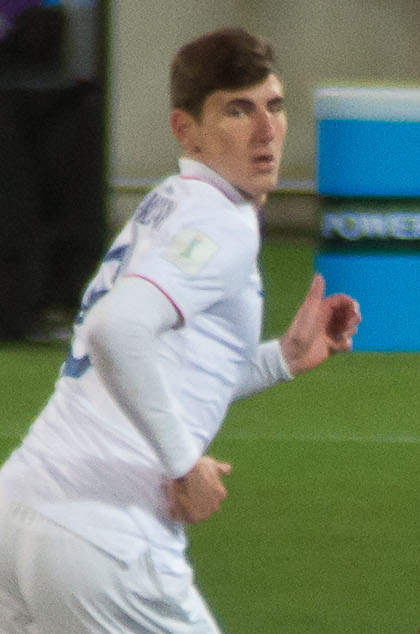
- Hyndman with the United States U20 at the 2015 FIFA U-20 World Cup

Personal information
- Full name: Emerson Schellas Hyndman
- Date of birth: April 9, 1996 (age 30)
- Place of birth: Dallas, Texas, United States
- Height: 5 ft 7 in (1.70 m)
- Position: Midfielder

Youth career
- Dallas Texans
- 2010–2011: FC Dallas
- 2011–2014: Fulham

Senior career*
Years	Team	Apps	(Gls)
2014–2016	Fulham	25	(1)
2016–2020	AFC Bournemouth	2	(0)
2017	→ Rangers (loan)	13	(4)
2018	→ Hibernian (loan)	15	(1)
2019	→ Atlanta United (loan)	15	(1)
2020–2022	Atlanta United	36	(3)
2023–2024	Memphis 901	40	(4)

International career^{‡}
2012	United States U17	3	(0)
2014–2015	United States U20	14	(3)
2014–2016	United States U23	9	(1)
2014–2020	United States	2	(0)
- * Club domestic league appearances and goals as of November 13, 2024 ‡ National team caps and goals as of May 22, 2016

Emerson Schellas Hyndman (born April 9, 1996) is an American professional soccer player who plays as a midfielder.

== Club career ==
=== Early career ===
Born in Dallas, Texas, Hyndman started his career in the U.S. Soccer Development Academy with the Dallas Texans before moving on to joining FC Dallas in 2010. During his time at FC Dallas, Hyndman attracted interest from Newcastle United after the club's director of football Dennis Wise saw him play, but ultimately Wise opted not to pursue him further.

=== Fulham ===
Hyndman joined the Fulham youth academy in 2011 aged 15. Hyndman revealed that the then club's head of youth development, Huw Jennings, convinced him to join the club. Hyndman revealed that moving to England was tough initially, but that he soon settled in thanks to the club. In 2012, Hyndman signed his first professional contract with the club.

On August 9, 2014, Hyndman made his professional debut for Fulham in a Championship fixture against Ipswich Town, starting and playing 90 minutes in a 2–1 loss. In his first season at Fulham, Hyndman made nine league appearances, due to playing in the reserves, being on the substitute bench and being sidelined with a broken collarbone.

In the 2015–16 season, it was reported by Goal.com that Hyndman turned down a contract extension twice with the club, leading to attracting interests. By September, Hyndman would stay at the club. Hyndman made his first appearance of 2015–16 season, playing 90 minutes, in a 1–0 loss against Stoke City in the third round of League Cup. After spending months in the reserves, Hyndman's first league appearance came on December 5, 2015, coming on as a substitute, in a 3–0 loss against Nottingham Forest. Following this, Hyndman was given a string of regular first team football, though he was left out of the starting eleven on more than one occasion when Fulham faced relegation. Despite this, Hyndman scored his first professional goal against Cardiff City on his 20th birthday. After the match, in which he scored the winning goal, Hyndman was named Man of the Match for his performance.

At the end of the season, manager Slaviša Jokanović stated Hyndman could leave the club with his blessing On May 15, 2016, ESPN reported that Hyndman would leave Fulham when his contract expires, although it revealed that Fulham would get compensation as a result for Hyndman's departure.

=== AFC Bournemouth ===
==== 2016–17: loan to Rangers ====
On June 17, 2016, Hyndman signed a four-year deal with AFC Bournemouth of the Premier League. He made his first appearance in a League Cup match against Morecambe.

On January 9, 2017, Hyndman signed for Scottish Premiership club Rangers until the end of the 2016–17 season. Hyndman made his Rangers debut in a Scottish Cup win over Motherwell at Ibrox Stadium on January 21, 2017, and scored his first goal for the club against the same opponents a week later. He was selected as Rangers Young Player of the Year for 2016–17, despite only joining the club in January.

==== 2017–18 ====
Hyndman returned to Bournemouth after his loan spell with Rangers, but made limited appearances during the 2017–18 season. He appeared in one EFL Cup tie and two FA Cup matches, then made his Premier League debut in May 2018.

==== 2018–19: loan to Hibernian ====
Hyndman was loaned to Scottish Premiership club Hibernian in August 2018, on a deal due to run until January 2019. He scored his first goal for the club in a 6–0 win against Hamilton Academical on October 6, 2018. Hyndman returned to Bournemouth at the end of his loan with Hibernian.

==== 2019: loan to Atlanta United ====
On July 1, 2019, Hyndman was loaned to Atlanta United of Major League Soccer, with the club holding an option to purchase him following the 2019 MLS season. Atlanta traded a 2019 and 2020 international roster slot, as well as $200,000 in guaranteed allocation money, to FC Dallas in exchange for his discovery rights.

=== Atlanta United ===
On December 9, 2019, it was announced that Hyndman's move to Atlanta United would become permanent. On January 4, 2023, Atlanta and Hyndman mutually agreed to terminate his contract with the club.

== International career ==
Hyndman represented the United States at under-17 level in 2012. He received his first senior call up in August 2014 after making three first team appearances for Fulham. On August 28, 2014, he was selected to the senior national team for their game against the Czech Republic on September 3. He made his senior team debut during the match, being subbed on in the 67th minute.

In May 2015, Hyndman captained the United States side in the 2015 FIFA U-20 World Cup in New Zealand. In his first match of the tournament, Hyndman scored the game winner to defeat Myanmar 2–1.

== Personal life ==
Hyndman is the grandson of former FC Dallas manager Schellas Hyndman. He holds Portuguese citizenship through his family history.

While growing up in United States, Hyndman excelled in baseball, basketball and soccer, but preferred soccer, as he stated he loved kicking a ball from a young age.

== Career statistics ==
=== Club ===
As of October 9, 2022

Club	Season	League			National cup		League cup		Continental		Total	
Club	Season	Division	Apps	Goals	Apps	Goals	Apps	Goals	Apps	Goals	Apps	Goals
Fulham	2014–15	Championship	9	0	—		2	0	—		11	0
Fulham	2015–16	Championship	16	1	—		1	0	—		17	1
Fulham	Total		25	1	—		3	0	—		28	1
AFC Bournemouth	2016–17	Premier League	—		1	0	2	0	—		3	0
AFC Bournemouth	2017–18	Premier League	1	0	2	0	1	0	—		4	0
AFC Bournemouth	2018–19	Premier League	1	0	—		—		—		1	0
AFC Bournemouth	Total		2	0	3	0	3	0	—		8	0
Rangers (loan)	2016–17	Scottish Premiership	13	4	4	0	—		—		17	4
Hibernian (loan)	2018–19 (Note: Soccerbase did not record appearances made by Hyndman against Molde on 9 August or 16 August 2018.)	Scottish Premiership	15	1	—		2	0	2	0	19	1
Atlanta United	2019	Major League Soccer	15	1	3	1	2	0	—		20	2
Atlanta United	2020	Major League Soccer	20	2	—		—		4	0	24	2
Atlanta United	2021	Major League Soccer	7	1	—		—		4	0	11	1
Atlanta United	2022	Major League Soccer	9	0	2	0	—		—		11	0
Atlanta United	Total		51	4	5	1	2	0	8	0	66	5
Career total			106	10	12	1	10	0	10	0	138	11

=== International ===
As of match played May 22, 2016

United States
Year	Apps	Goals
2014	1	0
2016	1	0
Total	2	0

== Honors ==
Atlanta United FC

- U.S. Open Cup: 2019
- Campeones Cup: 2019

USA U20

- CONCACAF U-20 Championship bronze: 2015

Individual

- Rangers Young Player of the Year: 2016–17
