= Leandro González Pírez =

Argentine footballer

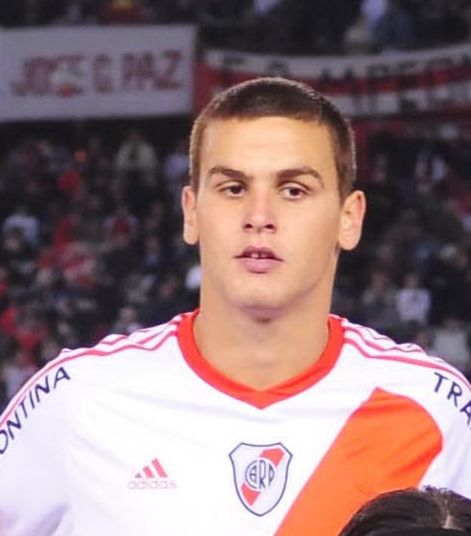
- González Pírez with River Plate in 2011

Personal information
- Full name: Leandro Martín González Pírez
- Date of birth: 26 February 1992 (age 34)
- Place of birth: Buenos Aires, Argentina
- Height: 1.85 m (6 ft 1 in)
- Position: Centre-back

Team information
- Current team: Estudiantes
- Number: 14

Youth career
- –2011: River Plate

Senior career*
Years	Team	Apps	(Gls)
2011–2014	River Plate	38	(1)
2013–2014	→ Gent (loan)	7	(0)
2014	→ Arsenal de Sarandí (loan)	13	(0)
2015	Tigre	30	(2)
2016–2017	Estudiantes	14	(0)
2017–2019	Atlanta United	95	(3)
2020	Tijuana	10	(1)
2020–2024	Inter Miami	46	(2)
2022–2023	→ River Plate (loan)	49	(2)
2024–2025	River Plate	32	(2)
2025–	Estudiantes	36	(4)

International career
2009	Argentina U17	8	(2)
2011	Argentina U20	9	(0)
2011	Argentina U23	4	(0)
- * Club domestic league appearances and goals as of 17:25, 21 November 2026 (UTC)

Leandro Martín González Pírez (born 26 February 1992) is an Argentine professional footballer who plays as a centre-back for Argentine Primera División club Estudiantes.

== Club career ==
González Pírez played his first professional game for River Plate coming on as a 90th-minute substitute in a 2–1 win over Newell's Old Boys, for the 2011 Clausura. He was loaned out twice while with River Plate to Belgian club Gent and to Argentine club Arsenal de Sarandí.

González Pírez signed with Atletico Tigre in 2015, appearing in thirty games in his sole season with the club. He then moved to Estudiantes from Atletico Tigre, earning fourteen caps with that club.

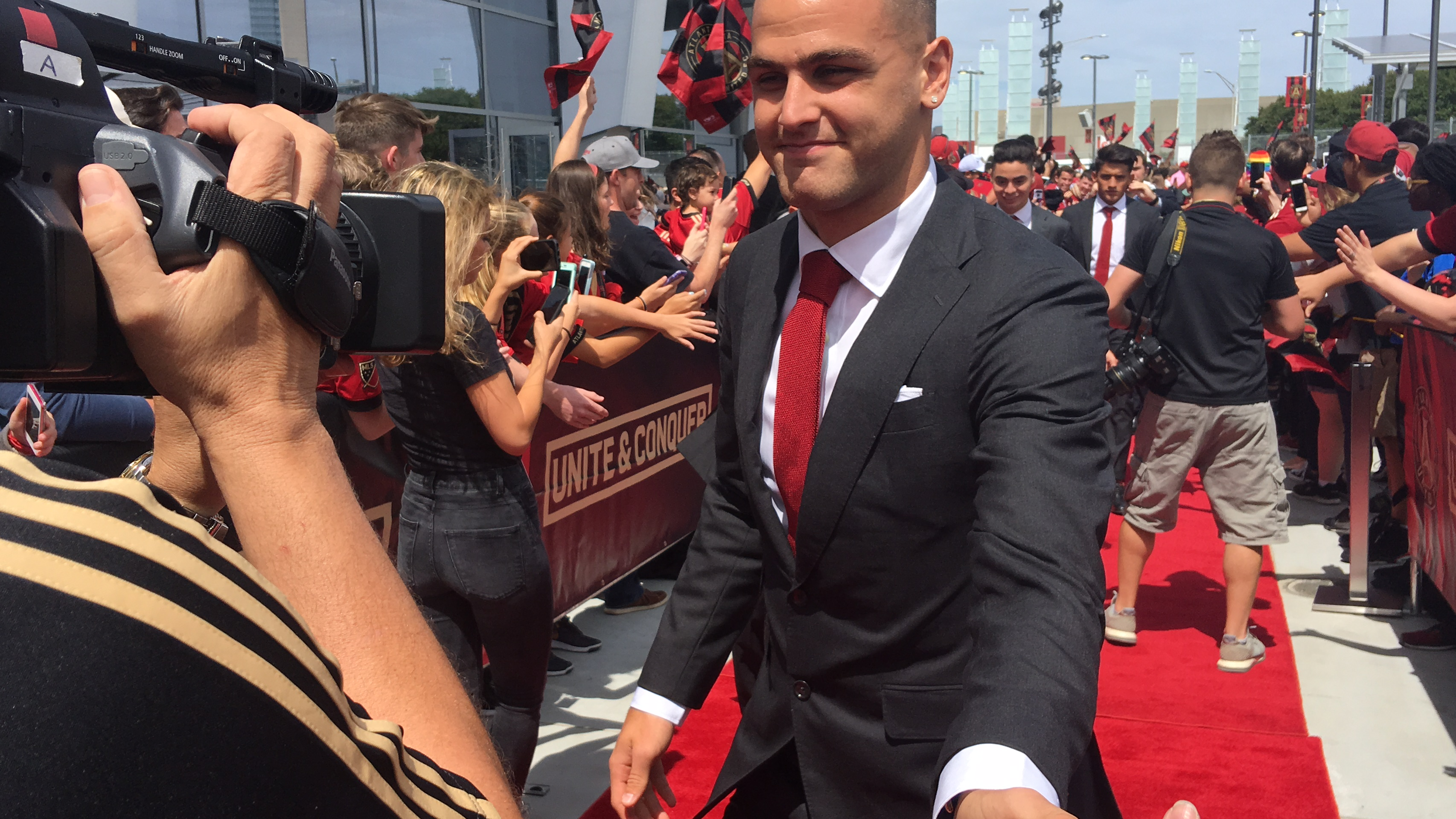
Leandro González Pírez after signing the Golden Spike, 10 September 2017

On 26 January 2017, González Pírez signed with Atlanta United FC from Estudiantes. On 10 September 2017, he scored the first goal ever at Mercedes-Benz Stadium during a 3–0 win over FC Dallas.

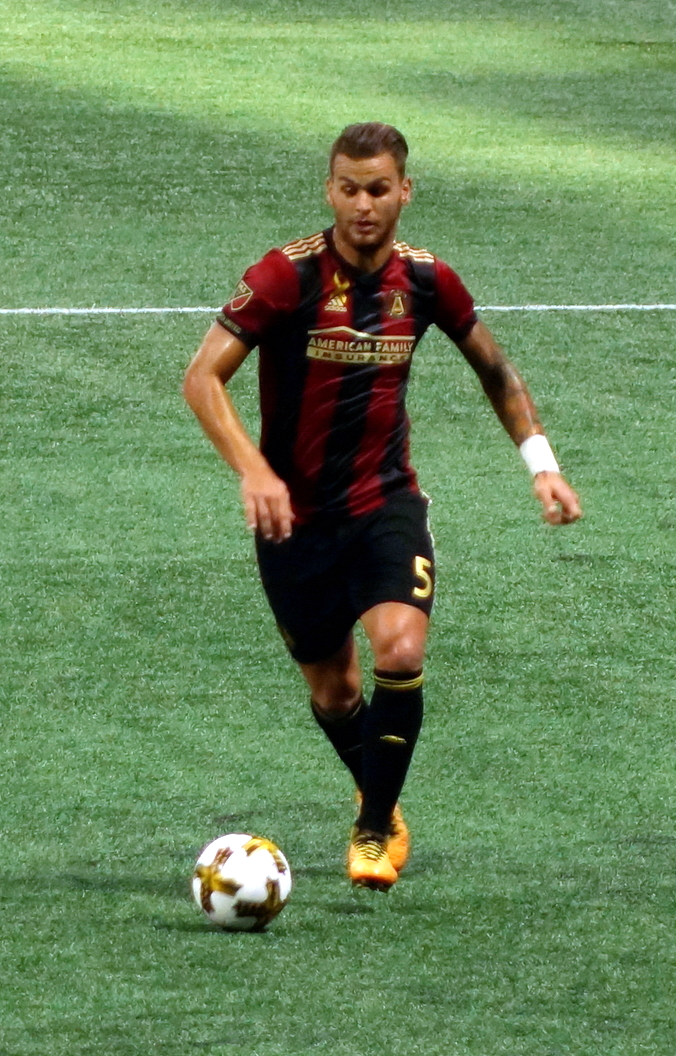
Leandro González Pírez playing for Atlanta United on 24 September 2017

On 10 January 2020, González Pírez completed a transfer to Club Tijuana of Liga MX for an undisclosed fee.

González Pírez returned to the United States on 1 July 2020, joining Inter Miami.

On January 10, 2022, Inter Miami announced he would be loaned to River Plate for 2 years with an option to buy. River Plate opted to make the deal permanent in January 2024.

On 9 July, González Pírez joined Estudiantes on a two-year deal after rescinding his contract with River Plate.

== International career ==
González Pírez was born in Argentina and is of Portuguese descent, holding dual citizenship. He has featured for Argentina at the under-17 and under-20 levels. He was part of the squad for the 2009 South American Under-17 Football Championship, scoring once as Argentina lost in the final to Brazil. He was also called up for the 2009 FIFA U-17 World Cup held in Nigeria, where he made three appearances.

In 2011, he was part of the Argentina team for the 2011 South American Youth Championship and 2011 FIFA U-20 World Cup.

== Career statistics ==
As of match played on 8 November 2020

Appearances and goals by club, season and competition
Club	Season	League			National cup (Note: Includes Copa Argentina, Belgian Cup, U.S. Open Cup and Copa MX)		League cup (Note: Includes Torneos de Verano)		Continental (Note: Includes Copa Sudamericana and CONCACAF Champions League)		Other (Note: Includes MLS Cup Playoffs)		Total	
Club	Season	Division	Apps	Goals	Apps	Goals	Apps	Goals	Apps	Goals	Apps	Goals	Apps	Goals
River Plate	2010–11	Argentine Primera División	5	0	0	0	—		—		—		5	0
River Plate	2011–12	Primera B Nacional	9	0	5	0	—		—		—		14	0
River Plate	2012–13	Argentine Primera División	24	1	0	0	—		—		—		24	1
River Plate	Total		38	1	5	0	0	0	0	0	0	0	43	1
Gent (loan)	2013–14	Belgian Pro League	7	0	1	0	—		—		—		8	0
Arsenal (loan)	2013–14	Argentine Primera División	13	0	0	0	—		5	0	—		18	0
Tigre	2015	Argentine Primera División	30	2	2	0	—		2	0	—		34	2
Estudiantes	2016	Argentine Primera División	10	0	1	0	1	0	—		—		12	0
Estudiantes	2016–17	Argentine Primera División	4	0	0	0	—		—		—		4	0
Estudiantes	Total		14	0	1	0	1	0	0	0	0	0	16	0
Atlanta United	2017	Major League Soccer	32	1	1	0	—		—		1	0	34	1
Atlanta United	2018	Major League Soccer	32	1	2	0	—		—		5	0	39	1
Atlanta United	2019	Major League Soccer	31	1	4	0	—		3	1	4	0	42	1
Atlanta United	Total		95	3	7	0	0	0	3	1	10	0	115	3
Tijuana	2019–20	Liga MX	10	1	4	2	—		—		—		14	3
Inter Miami	2020	Major League Soccer	16	2	—		—		—		—		16	2
Career total			223	9	20	2	1	0	10	1	10	0	264	11

== Honours ==
River Plate

- Primera B Nacional: 2011–12
- Argentine Primera División: 2023
- Trofeo de Campeones: 2023
- Supercopa Argentina: 2023

Atlanta United

- MLS Cup: 2018
- U.S. Open Cup: 2019
- MLS Eastern Conference: 2018
- Campeones Cup: 2019

Estudiantes

- Primera División: 2025 Clausura
- Trofeo de Campeones: 2025
- Supercopa Argentina: 2025

Individual

- MLS All-Star: 2019
- Argentine Primera División Team of the Season: 2023
