= 2022 Atlanta United FC season =

Atlanta United FC
2022 season
- Owner: Arthur Blank
- President: Darren Eales (until August 24)
- Head coach: Gonzalo Pineda
- Stadium: Mercedes-Benz Stadium; Atlanta, Georgia
- MLS: Eastern Conference: 11th Overall: 23rd
- MLS Cup Playoffs: Did not qualify
- U.S. Open Cup: Round of 32
- Top goalscorer: League: Josef Martínez (9); All: Josef Martínez (9)
- Highest home attendance: League/All: 68,586 (August 8 v. Seattle Sounders FC)
- Lowest home attendance: League: 42,504 (May 28 v. Columbus Crew); All: 3,740 (April 20 vs. Chattanooga FC)
- Average home league attendance: League: 47,116; All: 44,706
- Biggest win: 6 goals: ATL 6–0 CHA (April 20)
- Biggest defeat: 3 goals: COL 3–0 ATL (March 5); ATL 0–3 ATX (July 9); PHI 4–1 ATL (August 31)
Home colors	Away colors

The 2022 Atlanta United FC season was the sixth season of Atlanta United FC's existence, and the fourteenth year that a professional soccer club from Atlanta, Georgia competed in the top division of American soccer. Atlanta United played their home games at Mercedes-Benz Stadium. Outside of MLS, they participated in the 2022 U.S. Open Cup as defending champions, as the 2020 and 2021 editions of tournament were canceled due to the COVID-19 pandemic.

== Club ==
Squad no.	Name	Nationality	Position(s)	Date of birth (age)	Previous club	Apps	Goals
Goalkeepers
1	Brad Guzan (C)	(United States)	GK	September 9, 1984 (age 41)	(England) Middlesbrough	158	0
18	Bobby Shuttleworth	(United States)	GK	May 18, 1987 (age 38)	(United States) Chicago Fire FC	0	0
24	Dylan Castanheira	(United States)	GK	May 23, 1995 (age 30)	(United States) Inter Miami CF	0	0
—	Justin Garces (HGP)	(United States)	GK	August 23, 2000 (age 25)	(United States) UCLA	0	0
Defenders
2	Ronald Hernández	(Venezuela)	RB	September 21, 1997 (age 28)	(Scotland) Aberdeen	13	1
3	Alex DeJohn	(United States)	CB	May 10, 1991 (age 34)	(United States) Orlando City SC	4	0
6	Alan Franco	(Argentina)	CB	October 11, 1996 (age 29)	(Argentina) Independiente	27	0
11	Brooks Lennon	(United States)	RB	September 22, 1997 (age 28)	(United States) Real Salt Lake	62	2
12	Miles Robinson (GA)	(United States)	CB	March 14, 1997 (age 28)	(United States) Syracuse University	108	2
15	Andrew Gutman	(United States)	LB	October 2, 1996 (age 29)	(Scotland) Celtic	0	0
26	Caleb Wiley (HGP)	(United States)	LB	December 22, 2004 (age 21)	(United States) Atlanta United Academy	0	0
27	Bryce Washington (HGP)	(United States)	CB	September 12, 1998 (age 27)	(United States) University of Pittsburgh	0	0
32	George Campbell (HGP)	(United States)	CB	June 22, 2001 (age 24)	(United States) Atlanta United Academy	17	1
33	Mikey Ambrose	(United States)	LB	October 5, 1993 (age 32)	(United States) Inter Miami CF	31	0
—	Efrain Morales (HGP)	(United States)	CB	March 4, 2004 (age 22)	(United States) Atlanta United Academy	0	0
Midfielders
5	Santiago Sosa	(Argentina)	DM	May 3, 1999 (age 26)	(Argentina) River Plate	30	1
8	Thiago Almada (DP)	(Argentina)	AM	April 26, 2001 (age 24)	(Argentina) Vélez Sarsfield	0	0
9	Matheus Rossetto	(Brazil)	AM	June 3, 1996 (age 29)	(Brazil) Athletico Paranaense	39	0
10	Marcelino Moreno	(Argentina)	CM	June 25, 1994 (age 31)	(Argentina) Lanús	43	11
13	Amar Sejdič	(United States)	CM	November 29, 1996 (age 29)	(Canada) CF Montréal	10	0
14	Franco Ibarra	(Argentina)	DM	April 28, 2001 (age 24)	(Argentina) Argentinos Juniors	19	0
16	Osvaldo Alonso	(Cuba)	DM	November 11, 1985 (age 40)	(United States) Minnesota United FC	0	0
19	Luiz Araújo (DP)	(Brazil)	RW	June 2, 1996 (age 29)	(France) Lille	16	4
20	Emerson Hyndman	(United States)	CM	April 7, 1996 (age 29)	(England) AFC Bournemouth	56	6
23	Jake Mulraney	(Republic of Ireland)	AM	April 5, 1996 (age 29)	(Scotland) Hearts	47	2
28	Tyler Wolff (HGP)	(United States)	RW	February 13, 2003 (age 23)	(United States) Atlanta United Academy	12	0
30	Machop Chol (HGP)	(South Sudan)	RW	November 14, 1998 (age 27)	(United States) Wake Forest University	9	0
Forwards
4	Dom Dwyer	(United States)	CF	July 30, 1990 (age 35)	(Canada) Toronto	0	0
7	Josef Martínez (DP)	(Venezuela)	CF	May 19, 1993 (age 32)	(Italy) Torino	132	102
36	Jackson Conway (HGP)	(United States)	CF	December 3, 2001 (age 24)	(United States) Atlanta United 2	9	2

== Results ==
=== Non-competitive ===
==== Pre-season exhibitions ====
January 25	Atlanta United	2–0	Georgia Storm	Marietta, Georgia
11:00 EST	Wolff 1st half' Conway 1st half'	Report		Stadium: Children's Healthcare of Atlanta Training Ground
Note: Played in two 30-minute halves.

January 30	Georgia Revolution	0–4	Atlanta United	Athens, Georgia
12:00 EST		Report	Wolff 2'; Luiz Araújo 8'; Campbell 9'; Bloyou 62'	Stadium: Turner Soccer Complex; Attendance: 1,700

February 6	Celaya	1–2	Atlanta United	Guadalajara, Mexico
14:00 EST	1st period'	Report	2nd period' (o.g.); Mulraney 3rd period'	Stadium: Estadio Tres de Marzo
Note: Played in three 30-minute periods.

February 13	Guadalajara	3–0	Atlanta United	Guadalajara, Mexico
10:30 EST	1st half' (pen.); 1st half' 2nd half'	Report	Martínez (red card)	Stadium: Chivas Verde Valle
Note: Played in two 40-minute halves.

February 13	Tepatitlán	3–0	Atlanta United	Guadalajara, Mexico
13:30 EST	Goal	Report		Stadium: Chivas Verde Valle
Note: Played in two 40-minute halves.

February 20	Birmingham Legion	0–4	Atlanta United	Birmingham, Alabama
--:-- EST		Report	4' (o.g.); Martínez 42', 51'; Hernández	Stadium: Protective Stadium

==== American Family Insurance Cup ====
June 14	Atlanta United	3–2	Pachuca	Atlanta, GA
7:30 PM EST	Martínez 5'; Luiz Araújo 8'; Dwyer 56'	Report	Cabral 22'; Hurtado 25'	Stadium: Mercedes-Benz Stadium

=== Competitive ===
==== Major League Soccer regular season ====
February 27 1	Atlanta United	3–1	Sporting Kansas City	Atlanta, Georgia
3:00 PM ET, FS1	Robinson (yellow card) 3'; Alonso (yellow card) 11'; Luiz Araújo 20'; Gutman (yellow card) 22'; Dwyer 45+3'; Wiley 89'	Report	Mauri (yellow card) 58'; Fontàs (yellow card) 79'; Sallói 85'	Stadium: Mercedes-Benz Stadium; Attendance: 67,523; Referee: Ted Unkel

March 5 2	Colorado Rapids	3–0	Atlanta United	Commerce City, Colorado
6:00 PM ET	Trusty (yellow card) 21'; Rubio 33'; Price (yellow card) 42'; Lewis 48'; Kaye (yellow card) 51'; Shinyashiki (yellow card) 80', (goal) 87'	Report	Hernández (yellow card) 20'; Robinson (yellow card) 31' (yellow-red card) 86'; Dwyer (yellow card) 89'	Stadium: Dick's Sporting Goods Park; Attendance: 12,538; Referee: Joseph Dickerson

March 13 3	Atlanta United	2–1	Charlotte FC	Atlanta, Georgia
4:30 PM ET, FS1	Martínez 60' (pen.); Campbell (yellow card) 87'; Alonso (yellow card) 90+1'; Mulraney 90+6'	Report	Ortiz (yellow card) 30'; Franco (yellow card) 36'; Armour 66'; Bronico (yellow card) 75'; Ríos (yellow card) 84'	Stadium: Mercedes-Benz Stadium; Attendance: 43,055; Referee: Guido Gonzales Jr.

March 19 4	Atlanta United	3–3	CF Montréal	Atlanta, Georgia
4:00 PM ET	Gutman (yellow card) 4'; Martínez 6'; Dwyer (red card) 67'; Almada 85'; Lennon 90+2'; Sosa (yellow card) 90+4'	Report	Koné (yellow card) 10', (goal) 37'; Mihailovic 28'; Miller (yellow card) 31'; Quioto (yellow card) 31', (goal) 42' (pen.); Lappalainen (yellow card) 72'; Miljevic (yellow card) 82'; Camacho (yellow card) 90+1'; Johnston (yellow card) 90+6'	Stadium: Mercedes-Benz Stadium; Attendance: 42,578; Referee: Chris Penso

April 2 5	D.C. United	0–1	Atlanta United	Washington, D.C.
7:30 PM ET	Canouse (yellow card) 34'; Djeffal (yellow card) 38'	Report	Campbell (yellow card) 33'; Conway (yellow card) 81'; Almada (yellow card) 89'; Moreno 90+4'	Stadium: Audi Field; Attendance: 17,289; Referee: Armando Villarreal

April 10 6	Charlotte FC	1–0	Atlanta United	Charlotte, North Carolina
1:30 PM ET, ESPN	Alcívar 11'; Bronico (yellow card) 74'; Fuchs (yellow card) 74'; Lindsey (yellow card) 85'	Report	Ibarra (yellow card) 83'	Stadium: Bank of America Stadium; Attendance: 32,496; Referee: Allen Chapman

April 16 7	Atlanta United	0–0	FC Cincinnati	Atlanta, Georgia
6:00 PM ET	Almada (yellow card) 8'; Sejdić (yellow card) 42'; Campbell (yellow card) 84'	Report	Kubo (yellow card) 44'; Hagglund (yellow card) 45' (yellow-red card) 76'; Badji (yellow card) 90+4'	Stadium: Mercedes-Benz Stadium; Attendance: 42,948; Referee: Rubiel Vazquez

April 24 8	Inter Miami CF	2–1	Atlanta United	Fort Lauderdale, Florida
1:00 PM ET, ESPN	Campana 28'; Mabika (yellow card) 55'; Duke 64'; Yedlin (yellow card) 74'; Marsman (yellow card) 84'; Rodríguez (yellow card) 86'	Report	Cisneros 13'; Lennon (yellow card) 17'	Stadium: DRV PNK Stadium; Attendance: 13,433; Referee: Jair Marrufo

April 30 9	CF Montréal	2–1	Atlanta United	Montreal, Quebec
4:00 PM ET	Miller 4'; Camacho (yellow card) 10'; Wanyama (yellow card) 31'; Koné (yellow card) 59'; J. Torres 82'	Report	Moreno 51', (yellow card) 52'; Franco (yellow card) 55'; Ibarra (yellow card) 76'	Stadium: Saputo Stadium; Attendance: 15,060; Referee: Alex Chilowicz

May 7 10	Atlanta United	4–1	Chicago Fire FC	Atlanta, Georgia
6:00 PM ET	Cisneros 3', 27', 36'; Luiz Araújo (yellow card) 45+4'; Lennon 90+1'	Report	Offor 11', (yellow card) 36'; Navarro (yellow card) 30'; Mueller (yellow card) 72'	Stadium: Mercedes-Benz Stadium; Attendance: 42,547; Referee: Ramy Touchan

May 15 11	Atlanta United	2–2	New England Revolution	Atlanta, Georgia
2:00 PM EDT	Almada 15'; Luiz Araújo 63'; Gutman (yellow card) 68'	Report	Buksa 30', 55'; McNamara (yellow card) 87'; Polster (yellow card) 90+3'	Stadium: Mercedes-Benz Stadium; Attendance: 42,516; Referee: Allen Chapman

May 21 12	Nashville SC	2–2	Atlanta United	Nashville, Tennessee
7:00 PM CDT	Sapong 24', (yellow card) 72'; Mukhtar 31'; Godoy (yellow card) 59'; Muyl (yellow card) 82'; Zubak (yellow card) 83'	Report	Almada 26'; Ibarra (yellow card) 33'; Dwyer 88'	Stadium: Geodis Park; Attendance: 30,109; Referee: Ted Unkel

May 28 13	Atlanta United	1–2	Columbus Crew	Atlanta, Georgia
7:30 PM ET	Moreno (yellow card) 45+5'; Ibarra (yellow card) 45+10'; Franco (yellow card) 89'; Dwyer 90+1', (yellow card) 90+2'; Almada (red card) 90+7'	Report	Mensah 1'; Hurtado 45'; Sands (yellow card) 61'	Stadium: Mercedes-Benz Stadium; Attendance: 42,504; Referee: Joseph Dickerson

June 19 14	Atlanta United	2–0	Inter Miami CF	Atlanta, Georgia
4:00 PM ET, ESPN2	Luiz Araújo 4'; Martínez 61'	Report	Mota (yellow card) 25' (yellow-red card) 29'	Stadium: Mercedes-Benz Stadium; Attendance: 42,539; Referee: Armando Villarreal

June 25 15	Toronto FC	2–1	Atlanta United	Toronto, Ontario
7:30 PM ET	Osorio 8'; Nelson (yellow card) 28'; Salcedo (yellow card) 52'; Priso 78'	Report	Moreno (yellow card) 54'; Luiz Araújo 57', (yellow card) 70'	Stadium: BMO Field; Attendance: 25,527; Referee: Jon Freemon

June 30 16	New York Red Bulls	2–1	Atlanta United	Harrison, New Jersey
8:00 PM ET	Cásseres (yellow card) 28'; Long (yellow card) 42'; Edwards (yellow card) 51'; Morgan 83' (pen.); Ngoma 89'	Report	Sejdić (yellow card) 22'; Ibarra (yellow card) 45+2'; Martínez 75'; Ríos (yellow card) 82'	Stadium: Red Bull Arena; Attendance: 14,122; Referee: Alex Chilowicz

July 3 17	New York City FC	2–2	Atlanta United	New York, New York
5:00 PM ET	Chanot (yellow card) 18'; Rodríguez (yellow card) 24'; Castellanos 37', 58'; Talles Magno (yellow card) 52'; Morales (yellow card) 71'	Report	McFadden (yellow card) 16'; Luiz Araújo (yellow card) 47'; Martínez 56'; Dwyer 86'	Stadium: Yankee Stadium; Attendance: 17,704; Referee: Rosendo Mendoza

July 9 18	Atlanta United	0–3	Austin FC	Atlanta, Georgia
7:00 PM ET	Luiz Araújo (yellow card) 25'	Report	Felipe 9'; Finlay 17'; Gallagher (yellow card) 42'; Driussi 57'	Stadium: Mercedes-Benz Stadium; Attendance: 67,516; Referee: Jair Marrufo

July 13 19	Atlanta United	2–1	Real Salt Lake	Atlanta, Georgia
7:30 PM ET	Cisneros 7', 33'; Moreno (yellow card) 90+3'	Report	Kappelhof 37'; Holt (yellow card) 44'; Besler (yellow card) 56'	Stadium: Mercedes-Benz Stadium; Attendance: 42,509; Referee: Drew Fischer

July 17 20	Atlanta United	1–1	Orlando City SC	Atlanta, Georgia
3:00 PM ET, ABC	Sejdić (yellow card) 45+1'; McFadden (yellow card) 59'; Purata 71'; Luiz Araújo (yellow card) 90'	Report	Pereyra 10', (yellow card) 69'; Urso (yellow card) 36'; Michel (yellow card) 73'; Ruan (yellow card) 90+1'	Stadium: Mercedes-Benz Stadium; Attendance: 42,526; Referee: Victor Rivas

July 24 21	LA Galaxy	2–0	Atlanta United	Carson, California
9:30 PM ET, FS1	Cabral 7'; Brugman (yellow card) 52'; Delgado (yellow card) 90+3'; Joveljic 90+6'	Report	Sejdic (yellow card) 43'; Franco (yellow card) 67'; Dwyer (yellow card) 77'; Sosa (yellow card) 79'	Stadium: Dignity Health Sports Park; Attendance: 24,122; Referee: Marcos de Oliveira

July 30 22	Chicago Fire FC	0–0	Atlanta United	Chicago, Illinois
5:00 PM ET	Durán (yellow card) 41'; Shaqiri (yellow card) 63'	Report	Sosa (yellow card) 81'; Dwyer (yellow card) 90+5'	Stadium: Soldier Field; Attendance: 23,951; Referee: Timothy Ford

August 6 23	Atlanta United	2–1	Seattle Sounders FC	Atlanta, Georgia
3:00 PM ET, ABC	Cisneros 23'; Purata (yellow card) 89'; Gutman 90+4'	Report	C. Roldan 68'; A. Roldan (yellow card) 82'; Lodeiro (yellow card) 90+2'	Stadium: Mercedes-Benz Stadium; Attendance: 68,586; Referee: Armando Villarreal

August 13 24	FC Cincinnati	2–2	Atlanta United	Cincinnati, Ohio
7:30 PM ET	Barreal (yellow card) 14'; Vazquez 29'; Brenner 41'; Miazga (yellow card) 58'; Blackett (yellow card) 78'	Report	Almada 17'; Wiley (yellow card) 27'; Gutman 83'	Stadium: TQL Stadium; Attendance: 25,037; Referee: Fotis Bazakos

August 17 25	Atlanta United	1–2	New York Red Bulls	Atlanta, Georgia
7:30 PM ET	Gutman (yellow card) 80'; Martínez 90+4'	Report	Morgan 11'; Tolkin 15'; Duncan (yellow card) 45+4'; Klimala (yellow card) 66'; Coronel (yellow card) 87'	Stadium: Mercedes-Benz Stadium; Attendance: 42,555; Referee: Ted Unkel

August 21 26	Columbus Crew	2–2	Atlanta United	Columbus, Ohio
6:00 PM ET, FS1	Artur (yellow card) 31'; Etienne (yellow card) 51'; Hernández 66', 72'; Mensah (yellow card) 82'	Report	Sosa 21', (yellow card) 69'; Purata 77'; Mosquera (yellow card) 79'	Stadium: Lower.com Field; Attendance: 17,461; Referee: Joseph Dickerson

August 28 27	Atlanta United	3–2	D.C. United	Atlanta, Georgia
4:00 PM ET	Purata (yellow card) 18', (goal) 70'; Franco 49'; Martínez 62'	Report	Morrison 47'; Kamara 55'	Stadium: Mercedes-Benz Stadium; Attendance: 42,561; Referee: Nima Saghafi

August 31 28	Philadelphia Union	4–1	Atlanta United	Chester, Pennsylvania
7:30 PM ET	Carranza 18'; Bedoya (yellow card) 37'; Uhre 45+3', (yellow card) 51'; Gazdag 67'; Martínez (yellow card) 83'; McGlynn (yellow card) 90+3'; Harriel 90+5'	Report	Gutman 24'; Purata (yellow card) 47'; Dwyer (yellow card) 83'	Stadium: Subaru Park; Attendance: 18,214; Referee: Lukasz Szpala

September 4 29	Portland Timbers	2–1	Atlanta United	Portland, Oregon
5:30 PM ET, FOX	Moreno 38' (pen.); Asprilla (yellow card) 78', (goal) 82' (pen.)	Report	Martínez 88'	Stadium: Providence Park; Attendance: 24,438; Referee: Jon Freemon

September 10 30	Atlanta United	4–2	Toronto FC	Atlanta, Georgia
7:30 PM ET	Purata 47', 62', 88'; Almada 74'	Report	Akinola 52'; Bernardeschi 67' (pen.)	Stadium: Mercedes-Benz Stadium; Attendance: 42,670; Referee: Rosendo Mendoza

September 14 31	Orlando City SC	0–1	Atlanta United	Orlando, Florida
6:00 PM ET	Cartagena (yellow card) 37'	Report	Dwyer (yellow card) 50'; Almada 72'; Luiz Araújo (yellow card) 78'; Mosquera (yellow card) 90+4'	Stadium: Exploria Stadium; Attendance: 15,340; Referee: Rubiel Vazquez

September 17 32	Atlanta United	0–0	Philadelphia Union	Atlanta, Georgia
3:30 PM ET	Sejdić (yellow card) 49'; Purata (yellow card) 62'	Report	Carranza (yellow card) 11'; Martínez (yellow card) 73'; Gazdag (yellow card) 90+7'	Stadium: Mercedes-Benz Stadium; Attendance: 42,521; Referee: Guido Gonzales Jr.

October 1 33	New England Revolution	2–1	Atlanta United	Foxborough, Massachusetts
1:00 PM ET	N Gil (yellow card) 22'; Vrioni 32' (pen.); McNamara (yellow card) 43'; Bou 85'	Report	Sosa (yellow card) 5'; Gutman (yellow card) 45+1'; Martínez 81'	Stadium: Gillette Stadium; Attendance: 33,421; Referee: Armando Villarreal

October 9 34	Atlanta United	1–2	New York City FC	Atlanta, Georgia
2:30 PM EDT	Luiz Araújo (yellow card) 45+6'; Almada (yellow card) 64'; Gutman 67'; Purata (yellow card) 81'	Report	Pereira 9'; Callens (yellow card) 10'; Héber 60'; Rodríguez (yellow card) 72'; Johnson (yellow card) 83'; Tinnerholm (yellow card) 85'	Stadium: Mercedes-Benz Stadium; Attendance: 43,312; Referee: Chris Penso

==== U.S. Open Cup ====
April 20 Third round	Atlanta United (MLS) (Georgia (U.S. state))	6–0	(Tennessee) Chattanooga FC (NISA)	Kennesaw, Georgia
7:30 PM EDT	Hernández 21'; Dwyer 25', 35'; Moreno 53' (pen.); Luiz Araújo 67'; Lennon 84'	Report		Stadium: Fifth Third Bank Stadium; Attendance: 3,740; Referee: Matthew Thompson

May 11 Round of 32	Nashville SC (MLS) (Tennessee)	3–2 (a.e.t.)	(Georgia (U.S. state)) Atlanta United (MLS)	Nashville, Tennessee
7:00 PM CDT	Mukhtar 50' (pen.); Sapong 90+2'; Zubak 93'	Report	Almada 13'; Luiz Araújo 29'	Stadium: Geodis Park; Attendance: 12,375; Referee: Elton García

== Player movement ==
=== In ===
No.	Pos.	Player	Transferred from	Type	US	Fee/notes	Date	Source
—	DF	(Argentina) Franco Escobar	(Argentina) Newell's Old Boys	Loan return	US	Free	January 1, 2022	
15	DF	(United States) Andrew Gutman	(United States) New York Red Bulls	Loan return	US	Free	January 1, 2022	
16	MF	(Cuba) Osvaldo Alonso	(United States) Minnesota United FC	Transfer	US	Free	January 1, 2022	
24	GK	(United States) Dylan Castanheira	(United States) Inter Miami CF	Trade	US	Free	January 1, 2022	
—	GK	(United States) Justin Garces	(United States) UCLA	Transfer	US	Free	January 10, 2022	
18	GK	(United States) Bobby Shuttleworth	(United States) Chicago Fire FC	Transfer	US	Free	January 14, 2022	
2	DF	(Venezuela) Ronald Hernández	(Scotland) Aberdeen	Transfer	US	$725,000	January 17, 2022	
26	DF	(United States) Caleb Wiley	(United States) Atlanta United 2	Transfer	US	Free	January 18, 2022	
8	MF	(Argentina) Thiago Almada	(Argentina) Vélez Sarsfield	Transfer	Non-US	$16,000,000	February 9, 2022	
4	FW	(United States) Dom Dwyer	(Canada) Toronto FC	Transfer	US	Free	February 22, 2022	

=== Out ===
No.	Pos.	Player	Transferred to	Type	US	Fee/notes	Date	Source
29	MF	(England) Mo Adams	(United States) Inter Miami CF	Option Declined	US	Free	December 1, 2021	
24	DF	(United States) Josh Bauer	(United States) Nashville SC	Option Declined	US	Free	December 1, 2021	
25	GK	(United States) Alec Kann	(United States) FC Cincinnati	Option Declined	US	Free	December 1, 2021	
18	GK	(United States) Ben Lundgaard	Free agent (Note: Lundgaard retired following the 2021 season.)	Option Declined	US	Free	December 1, 2021	
31	FW	(Mexico) Erick Torres	(United States) Orange County SC	Option Declined	US	Free	December 1, 2021	
—	DF	(Argentina) Franco Escobar	(United States) Los Angeles FC	Transfer	US	Up to $600,000 GAM	December 12, 2021	
4	DF	(England) Anton Walkes	(United States) Charlotte FC	Expansion Draft	Non-US	$50,000 GAM	December 14, 2021	
2	DF	(Venezuela) Ronald Hernández	(Scotland) Aberdeen	Loan return	Non-US	Free	December 31, 2021	
21	DF	(United States) George Bello	(Germany) Arminia Bielefeld	Transfer	US	Undisclosed	January 31, 2022	
22	MF	(Mexico) Jurgen Damm	(Mexico) Club América	Buyout	Non-US	Undisclosed	February 25, 2022	

==== Loan Out ====
No.	Pos.	Player	Loaned to	Start	End	Source
8	MF	(Argentina) Ezequiel Barco	(Argentina) River Plate	January 30, 2022	December 31, 2022	
16	FW	(Paraguay) Erik López	(Argentina) Banfield	February 22, 2022	June 30, 2022	
—	GK	(United States) Justin Garces	(United States) Atlanta United 2	February 25, 2022	December 31, 2022	
35	DF	(United States) Efrain Morales	(United States) Atlanta United 2	February 25, 2022	December 31, 2022	
31	MF	(United States) Erik Centeno	(United States) Atlanta United 2	March 15, 2022	December 31, 2022	

=== Non-player transfers ===
Acquired	From	For	Source
$200K GAM	(United States) Inter Miami CF	International roster spot	
