= 2021 Atlanta United FC season =

Atlanta United FC
2021 season
- Owner: Arthur Blank
- President: Darren Eales
- Head coach: Gabriel Heinze (until July 18); Rob Valentino (interim, from July 18 to August 12); Gonzalo Pineda (from August 12)
- Stadium: Mercedes-Benz Stadium; Atlanta, Georgia
- MLS: Eastern Conference: 5th Overall: 9th
- MLS Cup playoffs: First round
- U.S. Open Cup: Canceled
- CONCACAF Champions League: Quarter-finals
- Top goalscorer: League: Josef Martínez (12); All: Josef Martínez (12)
- Biggest win: ATL 4–0 CIN (9/16, MLS)
- Biggest defeat: ATL 0–3 PHI (4/27, CCL); CHI 3–0 ATL (7/3, MLS)
Home colors	Away colors	Third colors

The 2021 Atlanta United FC season was the fifth season of Atlanta United FC's existence, and the thirteenth year that a professional soccer club from Atlanta, Georgia competing in the top division of American soccer. Atlanta United played their home games at Mercedes-Benz Stadium. Due to the cancelation of the 2020 U.S. Open Cup, Atlanta competed in the 2021 CONCACAF Champions League as the final berth was given to the defending champions of the U.S. Open Cup.

== Club ==
Squad no.	Name	Nationality	Position(s)	Date of birth (age)	Previous club	Apps	Goals
Goalkeepers
1	Brad Guzan (C)	(United States)	GK	September 9, 1984 (age 41)	(England) Middlesbrough	158	0
18	Ben Lundgaard	(United States)	GK	September 25, 1995 (age 30)	(United States) Atlanta United 2	0	0
25	Alec Kann	(United States)	GK	August 8, 1990 (age 35)	(United States) Sporting Kansas City	30	0
Defenders
2	Ronald Hernández	(Venezuela)	RB	September 21, 1997 (age 28)	(Scotland) Aberdeen	13	1
3	Alex DeJohn	(United States)	CB	May 10, 1991 (age 34)	(United States) Orlando City SC	4	0
4	Anton Walkes	(England)	RB	February 8, 1997 (age 29)	(England) Portsmouth	79	4
6	Alan Franco	(Argentina)	CB	October 11, 1996 (age 29)	(Argentina) Independiente	27	0
11	Brooks Lennon	(United States)	RB	September 22, 1997 (age 28)	(United States) Real Salt Lake	62	2
12	Miles Robinson (GA)	(United States)	CB	March 14, 1997 (age 28)	(United States) Syracuse University	108	2
21	George Bello (HGP)	(United States)	LB	January 22, 2002 (age 24)	(United States) Atlanta United Academy	59	3
24	Josh Bauer	(United States)	CB	July 22, 1998 (age 27)	(United States) Birmingham Legion	0	0
27	Bryce Washington (HGP)	(United States)	CB	September 12, 1998 (age 27)	(United States) University of Pittsburgh	0	0
32	George Campbell (HGP)	(United States)	CB	June 22, 2001 (age 24)	(United States) Atlanta United Academy	17	1
33	Mikey Ambrose	(United States)	LB	October 5, 1993 (age 32)	(United States) Inter Miami CF	31	0
Midfielders
5	Santiago Sosa	(Argentina)	DM	May 3, 1999 (age 26)	(Argentina) River Plate	30	1
8	Ezequiel Barco (DP)	(Argentina)	AM	March 23, 1999 (age 26)	(Argentina) Independiente	107	19
9	Matheus Rossetto	(Brazil)	AM	June 3, 1996 (age 29)	(Brazil) Athletico Paranaense	39	0
10	Marcelino Moreno	(Argentina)	CM	June 25, 1994 (age 31)	(Argentina) Lanús	43	11
13	Amar Sejdič	(United States)	CM	November 29, 1996 (age 29)	(Canada) CF Montréal	10	0
14	Franco Ibarra	(Argentina)	DM	April 28, 2001 (age 24)	(Argentina) Argentinos Juniors	19	0
19	Luiz Araújo (DP)	(Brazil)	RW	June 2, 1996 (age 29)	(France) Lille	16	4
20	Emerson Hyndman	(United States)	CM	April 7, 1996 (age 29)	(England) AFC Bournemouth	56	6
22	Jürgen Damm	(Mexico)	RW	November 7, 1992 (age 33)	(Mexico) UANL	27	1
23	Jake Mulraney	(Republic of Ireland)	AM	April 5, 1996 (age 29)	(Scotland) Hearts	47	2
28	Tyler Wolff (HGP)	(United States)	RW	February 13, 2003 (age 23)	(United States) Atlanta United Academy	12	0
29	Mo Adams (GA)	(England)	CM	September 23, 1996 (age 29)	(United States) Chicago Fire FC	28	1
30	Machop Chol (HGP)	(South Sudan)	RW	November 14, 1998 (age 27)	(United States) Wake Forest University	9	0
Forwards
7	Josef Martínez (DP)	(Venezuela)	CF	May 19, 1993 (age 32)	(Italy) Torino	132	102
16	Erik López	(Paraguay)	CF	November 27, 2001 (age 24)	(Paraguay) Olimpia	20	1
31	Erick Torres	(Mexico)	CF	January 19, 1993 (age 33)	(Mexico) Tijuana	36	1
36	Jackson Conway (HGP)	(United States)	CF	December 3, 2001 (age 24)	(United States) Atlanta United 2	9	2

=== International roster slots ===
Atlanta currently has ten International Roster Slots for use in the 2021 season. Matheus Rossetto obtained a green card in April 2021 to qualify as a domestic player for MLS roster purposes.

Atlanta United International Roster Slots
Slot	Player	Country
1	Luiz Araújo	Brazil
2	Jürgen Damm	Mexico
3	Alan Franco	Argentina
4	Ronald Hernández	Venezuela
5	Franco Ibarra	Argentina
6	Erik López	Paraguay
7	Marcelino Moreno	Argentina
8	Jake Mulraney	(Republic of Ireland) Ireland
9	Santiago Sosa	Argentina
10	Anton Walkes	England

== Results ==
=== Non-competitive ===
Win Draw Loss

==== Friendlies ====
March 13 Friendly	Atlanta United	3–0	Tormenta FC	Marietta, Georgia
	Wolff; Mulraney; Torres			Stadium: Children's Healthcare of Atlanta Training Ground; Attendance: 0
Note: Match was played behind closed doors

March 20 Friendly	Atlanta United	6–1	Charleston Battery	Atlanta, Georgia
	Barco (pen.), E. López; Chol; Torres; Lennon	Report	Cichero (pen.)	Stadium: Mercedes-Benz Stadium; Attendance: 0
Note: Match was played behind closed doors. Venue moved from Children's Healthcare of Atlanta Training Ground. Played in four 30-minute periods.

March 24 Friendly	Atlanta United	3–1	Chattanooga FC	Marietta, Georgia
	López; Robinson; Martínez	ATL Report; CFC Report	Naglestad	Stadium: Children's Healthcare of Atlanta Training Ground; Attendance: 0
Note: Match played behind closed doors

March 28 Friendly	Birmingham Legion	0–1	Atlanta United	Birmingham, Alabama
		Report	Walkes 33'	Stadium: BBVA Field; Attendance: 1,500
Note: Composed of four 35-minute quarters.

=== Major League Soccer ===
==== League tables ====
===== Eastern Conference =====
Pos	Team	Pld	W	L	T	GF	GA	GD	Pts	Qualification
3	Nashville SC	34	12	4	18	55	33	+22	54	MLS Cup First Round
4	New York City FC	34	14	11	9	56	36	+20	51	MLS Cup First Round
5	Atlanta United FC	34	13	9	12	45	37	+8	51	MLS Cup First Round
6	Orlando City SC	34	13	9	12	50	48	+2	51	MLS Cup First Round
7	New York Red Bulls	34	13	12	9	39	33	+6	48	MLS Cup First Round

Source: MLS
Rules for classification: 1) points; 2) total wins; 3) total goal differential; 4) total goals scored; 5) fewer disciplinary points; 6) away goal differential; 7) away goals scored; 8) home goals differential; 9) home goals scored; 10) coin toss (2 clubs tied) or drawing of lots (≥3 clubs tied)

===== Overall =====
Pos	Team	Pld	W	L	T	GF	GA	GD	Pts	Qualification
7	Nashville SC	34	12	4	18	55	33	+22	54	
8	New York City FC (C)	34	14	11	9	56	36	+20	51	CONCACAF Champions League
9	Atlanta United FC	34	13	9	12	45	37	+8	51	
10	Orlando City SC	34	13	9	12	50	48	+2	51	
11	Minnesota United FC	34	13	11	10	42	44	−2	49	

Source: MLS
Rules for classification: 1) points; 2) total wins; 3) total goal differential; 4) total goals scored; 5) fewer disciplinary points; 6) away goal differential; 7) away goals scored; 8) home goals differential; 9) home goals scored; 10) coin toss (2 clubs tied) or drawing of lots (≥3 clubs tied)
(C) MLS Cup champions

===== Results summary =====
Overall								Home						Away					
Pld	W	D	L	GF	GA	GD	Pts	W	D	L	GF	GA	GD	W	D	L	GF	GA	GD
34	13	12	9	45	37	+8	51	9	5	3	25	14	+11	4	7	6	20	23	−3

Source: Match reports

===== Results by round =====
Round	1	2	3	4	5	6	7	8	9	10	11	12	13	14	15	16	17	18	19	20	21	22	23	24	25	26	27	28	29	30	31	32	33	34
Stadium	A	H	A	A	H	A	H	H	A	H	A	A	H	A	H	A	A	A	H	H	A	H	H	H	H	A	H	A	A	H	H	H	A	A
Result	D	W	L	D	W	D	D	D	L	D	L	D	L	D	L	L	D	W	W	W	W	L	W	W	W	L	W	L	W	D	W	D	D	W
Position (conf.)	7	2	5	7	2	5	8	8	10	10	10	10	10	10	10	10	11	10	9	9	8	9	8	7										5
Position (league)	10	4	12	17	6	12	13	15	19	19	20	20	20	19	22	22	24	20	19	16	14	18	18	16										9

Updated to match(es) played on September 6, 2021. Source: Match reports
A = Away; H = Home; W = Win; D = Draw; L = Loss

==== Regular season ====
Win Draw Loss

April 17 1	Orlando City SC	0–0	Atlanta United	Orlando, Florida
3:00 PM EDT		Report		Stadium: Exploria Stadium; Attendance: 11,503; Referee: Jair Marrufo

April 24 2	Atlanta United	3–1	Chicago Fire FC	Atlanta, Georgia
8:00 PM EDT	Barco 23', (yellow card) 70'; Mulraney (yellow card) 27'; Kappelhof 66' (o.g.); Hyndman (yellow card) 81', (goal) 85'	Report	Stojanović 46'; Giménez (yellow card) 90'	Stadium: Mercedes-Benz Stadium; Attendance: 20,335; Referee: Allen Chapman

May 1 3	New England Revolution	2–1	Atlanta United	Foxborough, Massachusetts
7:00 PM EDT	Bye 19', (yellow card) 75'; Gil 53' (pen.); Polster (yellow card) 90+3'	Report	Mulraney (yellow card) 17'; Franco (yellow card) 29'; Sosa (yellow card) 33'; Moreno 43' (pen.)	Stadium: Gillette Stadium; Attendance: 9,502; Referee: Chris Penso

May 9 4	Inter Miami CF	1–1	Atlanta United	Fort Lauderdale, Florida
1:00 PM EDT	Gregore (yellow card) 6'; González Pírez (yellow card) 70'; Morgan 77'; Chapman (yellow card) 80'; Azcona (yellow card) 90+4'	Report	Martínez 9'; Moreno (yellow card) 22'; E. López (yellow card) 62'; Torres (yellow card) 90'	Stadium: DRV PNK Stadium; Attendance: 8,074; Referee: Joseph Dickerson

May 15 5	Atlanta United	1–0	CF Montréal	Atlanta, Georgia
7:00 PM EST	Sosa (yellow card) 17'; Moreno 90+4'	Report	Camacho (yellow card) 19'; Wanyama (yellow card) 29'; Struna (yellow card) 90'	Stadium: Mercedes-Benz Stadium; Attendance: 40,116; Referee: Silviu Petrescu

May 23 6	Seattle Sounders FC	1–1	Atlanta United	Seattle, Washington
4:30 PM EDT	Ruidíaz 6'; Tolo (yellow card) 31'; Arreaga (yellow card) 68'; A. Roldan (yellow card) 90+1'	Report	López (yellow card) 2'; Hyndman (yellow card) 32'; Martínez 86' (pen.); Rossetto (yellow card) 90+1'; Ibarra (yellow card) 90+3'	Stadium: Lumen Field; Attendance: 11,011; Referee: Kevin Stott

May 29 7	Atlanta United	2–2	Nashville SC	Atlanta, Georgia
3:30 PM EDT	Moreno 6', (yellow card) 41'; López 51'	Report	McCarty (yellow card) 57'; Lovitz (yellow card) 60'; Mukhtar 80', 83'; Haakenson (yellow card) 90+2'	Stadium: Mercedes-Benz Stadium; Attendance: 40,748; Referee: Alan Kelly

June 20 8	Atlanta United	2–2	Philadelphia Union	Atlanta, Georgia
2:00 PM EDT	Przybylko 58' (o.g.); López (yellow card) 76'; Walkes 83'	Report	Bedoya (yellow card) 30'; Flach (yellow card) 41'; Fontana (yellow card) 53'; Glesnes (yellow card) 60' (goal) 90+7'; Burke 84'	Stadium: Mercedes-Benz Stadium; Attendance: 42,523; Referee: Ted Unkel

June 23 9	New York City FC	1–0	Atlanta United	Harrison, New Jersey
7:30 PM EDT	Tajouri-Shradi 69'	Report	Sosa (yellow card) 12'; Barco (yellow card) 45'; López (yellow card) 55'	Stadium: Red Bull Arena; Attendance: 3,564; Referee: Ismail Elfath
Note: The match was held at Red Bull Arena due to scheduling conflicts at New York City FC's home stadium, Yankee Stadium. New York City FC played as the home team for this match.

June 27 10	Atlanta United	0–0	New York Red Bulls	Atlanta, Georgia
3:30 PM EDT	Sosa (yellow card) 65'; Franco (yellow card) 90+5'	Report	Edwards (yellow card) 22'; Davis (yellow card) 69'; Tolkin (yellow card) 85'; Tarek (yellow card) 86'	Stadium: Mercedes-Benz Stadium; Attendance: 42,575; Referee: Alan Kelly

July 3 11	Chicago Fire FC	3–0	Atlanta United	Chicago, Illinois
8:00 PM EST	Bornstein (yellow card) 26'; Frankowski (yellow card) 31', (goal) 58'; Aliseda 34', 45+6'	Report	Bello (yellow card) 27'; Wolff (yellow card) 52'; Walkes (yellow card) 69'	Stadium: Soldier Field; Attendance: 14,898; Referee: Baldomero Toledo

July 8 12	Nashville SC	2–2	Atlanta United	Nashville, Tennessee
8:30 PM EDT	Anibaba 14'; Leal (yellow card) 28'; Mukhtar 49' (pen.); Haakenson (yellow card) 82'; McCarty (yellow card) 89'	Report	Walkes 5'; Wolff (yellow card) 39'; Sosa (yellow card) 44'; Torres (yellow card) 47'; Conway 58'; Moreno (yellow card) 67'; Mulraney	Stadium: Nissan Stadium; Attendance: 22,913; Referee: Joe Dickerson

July 17 13	Atlanta United	0–1	New England Revolution	Atlanta, Georgia
5:00 PM EDT	Franco (yellow card) 69'; Conway (yellow card) 75'	Report	Bou 18'; Kessler (yellow card) 77'	Stadium: Mercedes-Benz Stadium; Attendance: 42,517; Referee: Victor Rivas

July 21 14	FC Cincinnati	1–1	Atlanta United	Cincinnati, Ohio
7:00 PM EDT	Gyau (yellow card) 38'; Vallecilla (yellow card) 45+3'; Acosta 61', (yellow card) 86'	Report	Sosa (yellow card) 64'; Hernández 70', (yellow card) 71'	Stadium: TQL Stadium; Attendance: 23,162; Referee: Tori Penso

July 24 15	Atlanta United	0–1	Columbus Crew	Atlanta, Georgia
3:30 PM EDT		Report	Hurtado (yellow card) 44'; Mensah 65'; Francis (yellow card) 90+2'	Stadium: Mercedes-Benz Stadium; Attendance: 67,507; Referee: Robert Sibiga

July 30 16	Orlando City SC	3–2	Atlanta United	Orlando, Florida
8:00 PM EDT	Smith 43'; Perea (yellow card) 64' van der Water 79'; Nani 87'	Report	Martínez 1'; Moreno 66'; Franco (yellow card) 86'	Stadium: Exploria Stadium; Referee: Rubiel Vazquez

August 4 17	CF Montréal	2–2	Atlanta United	Montreal, Quebec
7:30 PM EDT	Struna (yellow card) 19'; Toye 53'; Camacho 63', (red card) 73'; Wanyama (red card) 82'; Mihailovic (yellow card) 85'	Report	Campbell (yellow card) 27'; Martínez 65', (red card) 82'; Moreno 76' (pen.), (yellow card) 90+6'; Damm (yellow card) 90'	Stadium: Saputo Stadium; Attendance: 11,000; Referee: David Gantar

August 7 18	Columbus Crew	2–3	Atlanta United	Columbus, Ohio
7:30 PM EDT	Mensah 37'; Santos 90+1' (pen.); Room (yellow card) 90+7'	Report	Barco 5', 35' (pen.); Sosa (yellow card) 45+3'; Moreno 65' (pen.); Walkes (yellow card) 66'	Stadium: Mapfre Stadium; Attendance: 20,094; Referee: Allen Chapman

August 15 19	Atlanta United	1–0	LAFC	Atlanta, Georgia
4:00 PM EDT	Martínez 46'; Bello (yellow card) 85'	Report	Atuesta (yellow card) 90+6'	Stadium: Mercedes-Benz Stadium; Attendance: 67,503; Referee: Chris Penso

August 18 20	Atlanta United	1–0	Toronto FC	Atlanta, Georgia
7:00	Barco 20'	Report		Stadium: Mercedes-Benz Stadium; Attendance: 42,502; Referee: Alan Kelly

August 21 21	D.C. United	1–2	Atlanta United	Washington D.C.
8:00 PM EDT	Alfaro (yellow card) 50'; Reyna 54'; Canouse (yellow card) 58'; J. Moreno (yellow card) 73'; Gressel (yellow card) 75'	Report	Martínez 25'; Bello (yellow card) 29'; M. Moreno 82'	Stadium: Audi Field; Attendance: 17,180; Referee: Nima Saghafi

August 28 22	Atlanta United	0–2	Nashville SC	Atlanta, Georgia
3:30 PM EDT	Barco (yellow card) 37'; Sejdič (yellow card) 61'	Report	Lovitz (yellow card) 26'; Ríos 45+2'; Anunga (yellow card) 74'; Leal 90+5'	Stadium: Mercedes-Benz Stadium; Attendance: 42,506; Referee: Rosendo Mendoza

September 10 23	Atlanta United	3–0	Orlando City SC	Atlanta, Georgia
7:30 PM EDT	Campbell 25', (yellow card) 45+1'; Franco (yellow card) 34'; Dike 38' (o.g.); Barco 72'; Sosa (yellow card) 81'	Report	Carlos (yellow card) 37'	Stadium: Mercedes-Benz Stadium; Attendance: 42,507; Referee: Victor Rivas

September 15 24	Atlanta United	4–0	FC Cincinnati	Atlanta, Georgia
	Luiz Araújo 5'; Martínez 40', 55'; Adams (yellow card) 73'; Barco 86'; Wolff (yellow card) 90+1'	Report	Brenner (yellow card) 39'; Castillo (yellow card) 45'; Matarrita (yellow card) 54'; Vazquez (yellow card) 79'; Duvall (yellow card) 82'	Stadium: Mercedes-Benz Stadium; Attendance: 42,501; Referee: Drew Fischer

September 18 25	Atlanta United	3–2	D.C. United	Atlanta, Georgia
3:30 PM EDT	Barco 18'; Martínez 64'; Franco (yellow card) 65'; Luiz Araújo (yellow card) 81'; Bello 87'	Report	Brillant (yellow card) 27'; J. Moreno (yellow card) 34'; Paredes (yellow card) 50'; Felipe 75'; Alfaro (yellow card) 77'; Flores 90+4'	Stadium: Mercedes-Benz Stadium; Attendance: 42,608; Referee: Joseph Dickerson

September 25 26	Philadelphia Union	1–0	Atlanta United	Philadelphia, Pennsylvania
3:30 PM EDT	Martínez (yellow card) 39'; Przybyłko 71'	Report	Moreno (yellow card) 31'	Stadium: Subaru Park; Referee: Robert Sibiga

September 29 27	Atlanta United	1–0	Inter Miami CF	Atlanta, Georgia
7:30 PM EDT	Martínez 78' (pen.)	Report	González Pírez (yellow card) 24'; Matuidi (yellow card) 34'; Gibbs (yellow card) 48'; Chapman (yellow card) 89'	Stadium: Mercedes-Benz Stadium; Attendance: 42,519; Referee: Ted Unkel

October 2 28	CF Montréal	2–1	Atlanta United	Montreal, Canada
7:00 PM EDT	Quioto 49', 55' (pen.); Ibrahim (yellow card) 78'; Camacho (yellow card) 87'; Choinière (yellow card) 90+4'	Report	Mulraney 48'; Walkes (yellow card) 53'	Stadium: Saputo Stadium; Referee: Fotis Bazakos

October 16 29	Toronto FC	0–2	Atlanta United	Toronto, Canada
7:30 PM EDT	Achara (yellow card) 24'; Auro Jr. (red card) 83'; Delgado (yellow card) 90+2'	Report	Rossetto (yellow card) 16'; Luiz Araújo 45+2'; Barco (red card) 84'; Moreno 90+7'; Walkes (yellow card) 90+8'	Stadium: BMO Field; Attendance: 7,490; Referee: Timothy Ford

October 20 30	Atlanta United	1–1	New York City FC	Atlanta, Georgia
7:30 PM EDT	Moreno 17'; Franco (yellow card) 60'; Robinson (yellow card) 85'	Report	Moralez (yellow card) 24'; Þórarinsson 90'; Sands (yellow card) 90+3'	Stadium: Mercedes-Benz Stadium; Attendance: 42,511; Referee: Rubiel Vazquez

October 27 31	Atlanta United	2–1	Inter Miami CF	Atlanta, Georgia
7:30 PM EDT	Walkes (yellow card) 21'; Luiz Araújo 59'; Martínez 73'; Guzan (yellow card) 90+4'; Torres (yellow card) 90+5'	Report	Figal (yellow card) 24'; G. Higuaín 32' (pen.), (yellow card) 67'; González Pírez (yellow card) 37'; Chapman (yellow card) 55'; Leerdam (yellow card) 57'	Stadium: Mercedes-Benz Stadium; Attendance: 42,536; Referee: Guido Gonzales, Jr.

October 30 32	Atlanta United	1–1	Toronto FC	Atlanta, Georgia
6:00 PM EDT	Luiz Araújo 15'; Barco (yellow card) 56'	Report	DeLeon (yellow card) 17'; Lawrence (yellow card) 69'; Perruzza 88'	Stadium: Mercedes-Benz Stadium; Attendance: 43,372; Referee: Alex Chilowicz

November 3 33	New York Red Bulls	0–0	Atlanta United	Harrison, New Jersey
7:30 PM EDT	Klimala (yellow card) 51'; Nealis (yellow card) 90+1'	Report	Luiz Araújo (yellow card) 11'; Walkes (yellow card) 90+1'	Stadium: Red Bull Arena; Attendance: 15,934; Referee: Alan Kelly

November 7 34	FC Cincinnati	1–2	Atlanta United	Cincinnati, Ohio
3:30 PM EST	Bailey 21'; Stanko (yellow card) 33'; Matarrita (yellow card) 88'	Report	Hernández (yellow card) 64'; Robinson 70'; Martínez 79'; Araújo (yellow card) 86'	Stadium: TQL Stadium; Attendance: 23,663; Referee: Nima Saghafi

=== MLS Cup Playoffs ===
November 21 First round	New York City FC	2–0	Atlanta United FC	New York, New York
2:00PM EST	Castellanos 49'; Callens 53'	Report	Franco (yellow card) 43' (yellow-red card) 90+3'; Moreno (yellow card) 81'	Stadium: Yankee Stadium; Attendance: 25,267; Referee: Chris Penso

=== CONCACAF Champions League ===
==== Round of 16 ====
April 6 First leg	Alajuelense (Costa Rica)	0–1	(United States) Atlanta United	Alajuela, Costa Rica
8:00 PM EDT	Venegas (yellow card) 76'	Report	Guzan (red card) 43'; Barco 50' (pen.); Walkes (yellow card) 57'; Ríos Novo (yellow card) 69'; Ibarra (yellow card) 82'	Stadium: Estadio Alejandro Morera Soto; Attendance: 0 (closed door); Referee: Saíd Martínez (Honduras)

April 13 Second leg	Atlanta United (United States)	1–0 (2–0 agg.)	(Costa Rica) Alajuelense	Kennesaw, United States
6:00 PM EDT	Damm 90+1'	Report		Stadium: Fifth Third Bank Stadium; Attendance: 2,000; Referee: Adonai Escobedo (Mexico)

==== Quarter-finals ====
April 27 First leg	Atlanta United (United States)	0–3	(United States) Philadelphia Union	Atlanta, United States
8:00 PM EDT	Hyndman (yellow card) 48'	Report	Martínez (yellow card) 7'; Przybyłko 57', 73'; Fontana 86'	Stadium: Mercedes-Benz Stadium; Attendance: 17,533; Referee: Jair Marrufo (United States)

May 4 Second leg	Philadelphia Union (United States)	1–1 (4–1 agg.)	(United States) Atlanta United	Chester, United States
8:00 PM EDT	Elliott (yellow card) 43'; Monteiro (yellow card) 51'; Mbaizo (yellow card) 74'; Real (yellow card) 80'; Przybyłko 88'	Report	Sosa 45+2'; Moreno (yellow card) 61'	Stadium: Subaru Park; Referee: Armando Villarreal (United States)

== Statistics ==
=== Appearances and goals ===
As of November 21, 2021

No.	Pos	Nat	Player	Total		MLS		MLS Cup Playoffs		Champions League	
No.	Pos	Nat	Player	Apps	Goals	Apps	Goals	Apps	Goals	Apps	Goals
Goalkeepers
1	GK	(United States) USA	Brad Guzan	33	0	29	0	1	0	3	0
18	GK	(United States) USA	Ben Lundgaard	0	0	0	0	0	0	0	0
25	GK	(United States) USA	Alec Kann	5	0	5	0	0	0	0	0
34	GK	(Argentina) ARG	Rocco Ríos Novo	2	0	0	0	0	0	1+1	0
Defenders
2	DF	(Venezuela) VEN	Ronald Hernández	13	1	8+5	1	0	0	0	0
3	DF	(United States) USA	Alex DeJohn	4	0	1+3	0	0	0	0	0
4	DF	(England) ENG	Anton Walkes	36	2	32+1	2	0	0	3	0
6	DF	(Argentina) ARG	Alan Franco	27	0	23+2	0	1	0	1	0
11	DF	(United States) USA	Brooks Lennon	36	0	30+2	0	1	0	3	0
12	DF	(United States) USA	Miles Robinson	31	1	25+1	1	1	0	4	0
21	DF	(United States) USA	George Bello	34	1	26+3	1	1	0	4	0
32	DF	(United States) USA	George Campbell	16	1	6+9	1	0	0	0+1	0
33	DF	(United States) USA	Mikey Ambrose	4	0	1+3	0	0	0	0	0
Midfielders
5	MF	(Argentina) ARG	Santiago Sosa	30	1	25	0	1	0	4	1
8	MF	(Argentina) ARG	Ezequiel Barco	29	8	23+2	7	1	0	3	1
9	MF	(Brazil) BRA	Matheus Rossetto	22	0	15+6	0	1	0	0	0
10	MF	(Argentina) ARG	Marcelino Moreno	36	9	30+2	9	1	0	3	0
13	MF	(United States) USA	Amar Sejdič	10	0	5+5	0	0	0	0	0
14	MF	(Argentina) ARG	Franco Ibarra	19	0	9+7	0	0	0	3	0
19	MF	(Brazil) BRA	Luiz Araújo	16	4	14+1	4	1	0	0	0
20	MF	(United States) USA	Emerson Hyndman	11	1	7	1	0	0	4	0
22	MF	(Mexico) MEX	Jürgen Damm	13	1	1+9	0	0+1	0	1+1	1
23	MF	(Republic of Ireland) IRL	Jake Mulraney	26	1	13+9	1	0+1	0	2+1	0
28	MF	(United States) USA	Tyler Wolff	7	0	2+5	0	0	0	0	0
29	MF	(England) ENG	Mo Adams	6	0	2+4	0	0	0	0	0
30	MF	(South Sudan) SSD	Machop Chol	9	0	4+5	0	0	0	0	0
Forwards
7	FW	(Venezuela) VEN	Josef Martínez	29	12	18+6	12	1	0	3+1	0
16	FW	(Paraguay) PAR	Erik López	19	1	10+8	1	0	0	1	0
31	MF	(Mexico) MEX	Erick Torres	22	0	7+13	0	0	0	0+2	0
36	FW	(United States) USA	Jackson Conway	8	1	2+6	1	0	0	0	0
Players who have played for Atlanta United this season but have left the club:
15	FW	(Argentina) ARG	Lisandro López	4	0	2	0	0	0	1+1	0
26	DF	(England) ENG	Jack Gurr	1	0	0+1	0	0	0	0	0

=== Top scorers ===
As of December 30, 2021

Place	Position	Name	MLS	Playoffs	Champions League	Total
1	FW	(Venezuela) Josef Martínez	12	0	0	12
2	MF	(Argentina) Marcelino Moreno	9	0	0	9
3	MF	(Argentina) Ezequiel Barco	7	0	1	8
4	MF	(Brazil) Luiz Araújo	4	0	0	4
5	DF	(England) Anton Walkes	2	0	0	2
6	DF	(United States) George Bello	1	0	0	1
6	DF	(United States) George Campbell	1	0	0	1
6	FW	(United States) Jackson Conway	1	0	0	1
6	MF	(Mexico) Jürgen Damm	0	0	1	1
6	DF	(Venezuela) Ronald Hernández	1	0	0	1
6	MF	(United States) Emerson Hyndman	1	0	0	1
6	FW	(Paraguay) Erik López	1	0	0	1
6	MF	(Republic of Ireland) Jake Mulraney	1	0	0	1
6	DF	(United States) Miles Robinson	1	0	0	1
6	MF	(Argentina) Santiago Sosa	0	0	1	1
Own Goals			3	0	0	3
Total			45	0	3	48

== Player movement ==
=== In ===
No.	Pos.	Player	Transferred from	Type	US	Fee/notes	Date	Source
24	FW	(United States) JJ Williams	(United States) Birmingham Legion	Loan return	US	Free	November 30, 2020	
30	MF	(United States) Andrew Carleton	(United States) Indy Eleven	Loan return	US	Free	November 30, 2020	
—	MF	(United States) Lagos Kunga	(United States) Phoenix Rising	Loan return	US	Free	November 30, 2020	
36	FW	(United States) Jackson Conway	(United States) Atlanta United 2	Transfer	US	Signed as a Homegrown Player (HGP)	December 3, 2020	
33	DF	(United States) Mikey Ambrose	(United States) Inter Miami CF	Transfer	US	Free	December 22, 2020	
35	DF	(United States) Efrain Morales	(United States) Atlanta United Academy	Transfer	US	Signed as a Homegrown Player (HGP)	January 1, 2021	
16	FW	(Paraguay) Erik López	(United States) Atlanta United 2	Transfer	Non-US	Free (Note: López signed with Atlanta United 2 in July 2020 from Paraguayan club Olimpia for $1.1 million before joining the senior team roster in 2021.)	January 1, 2021	
30	MF	(South Sudan) Machop Chol	(United States) Wake Forest University	Transfer	US	Signed as a Homegrown Player (HGP)	January 19, 2021	
15	FW	(Argentina) Lisandro López	(Argentina) Racing Club	Transfer	Non-US	Free	January 25, 2021	
5	MF	(Argentina) Santiago Sosa	(Argentina) River Plate	Transfer	Non-US	Undisclosed	February 12, 2021	
14	MF	(Argentina) Franco Ibarra	(Argentina) Argentinos Juniors	Transfer	Non-US	Undisclosed	February 22, 2021	
18	GK	(United States) Ben Lundgaard	(United States) Atlanta United 2	Transfer	US	Free	March 4, 2021	
—	DF	(United States) Andrew Gutman	(Scotland) Celtic	Transfer (Note: Atlanta United acquired Gutman's MLS rights via the 2020 MLS Re-Entry Draft.)	US	Undisclosed	March 9, 2021	
3	DF	(United States) Alex DeJohn	(United States) Orlando City SC	Transfer	US	Free	March 12, 2021	
26	DF	(England) Jack Gurr	(United States) Atlanta United 2	Transfer	US	Free	April 5, 2021	
6	DF	(Argentina) Alan Franco	(Argentina) Independiente	Transfer	Non-US	$2.8 Million (DP)	April 8, 2021	
24	DF	(United States) Josh Bauer	(United States) Birmingham Legion	Transfer	US	Draft Pick	April 15, 2021	
27	DF	(United States) Bryce Washington	(United States) University of Pittsburgh	Transfer	US	Signed as a Homegrown Player (HGP)	June 4, 2021	
13	MF	(United States) Amar Sejdič	(Canada) CF Montréal	Trade	US	$100K GAM	July 6, 2021	
19	MF	(Brazil) Luiz Araújo	(France) Lille	Transfer	Non-US	$12 Million (DP)	August 5, 2021	

==== Loan in ====
No.	Pos.	Player	Loaned From	US	Start	End	Source
2	DF	(Venezuela) Ronald Hernández	(Scotland) Aberdeen	Non-US	February 18, 2021	End of Season	
34	GK	(Argentina) Rocco Ríos Novo	(United States) Atlanta United 2	US	April 5, 2021	April 9, 2021	
34	GK	(Argentina) Rocco Ríos Novo	(United States) Atlanta United 2	US	April 13, 2021	April 17, 2021	

==== SuperDraft picks ====
Draft picks are not automatically signed to the team roster. Only trades involving draft picks and executed after the start of 2021 MLS SuperDraft are listed in the notes. Atlanta have three selections in the draft.

2021 Atlanta United SuperDraft Picks
Round	Selection	Player	Position	College	Status
2	31 (Note: Atlanta United traded the No. 5 and No. 32 overall picks to D.C. United in exchange for $125,000 in General Allocation Money (GAM) and the 31st overall pick.)	(United States) Josh Bauer	DF	New Hampshire	US
3	59	(United States) Aiden McFadden	MF	Notre Dame	US

=== Out ===
No.	Pos.	Player	Transferred to	Type	US	Fee/notes	Date	Source
13	GK	(United States) Brendan Moore	Free agent	Option Declined	US	Free	November 24, 2020	
18	MF	(United States) Jeff Larentowicz	Retired	Out of Contract	US	Free	November 30, 2020	
19	DF	(United States) Edgar Castillo	(United States) FC Cincinnati	Option Declined	US	Free	November 30, 2020	
24	FW	(United States) JJ Williams	(United States) Birmingham Legion	Option Declined	US	Free	November 30, 2020	
27	MF	(England) Laurence Wyke	(United States) Tampa Bay Rowdies	Option Declined	Non-US	Free	November 30, 2020	
30	MF	(United States) Andrew Carleton	Free agent	Option Declined	US	Free	November 30, 2020	
—	MF	(United States) Lagos Kunga	Free agent	Option Declined	US	Free	November 30, 2020	
26	MF	(Republic of Ireland) Jon Gallagher	(United States) Austin FC	Trade	US	$225K GAM	December 13, 2020	
15	MF	(Uruguay) Manuel Castro	(Argentina) Estudiantes	Loan return	Non-US	Free	January 1, 2021	
14	MF	(United States) Adam Jahn	(United States) Orange County SC	Waived	US	Free	February 2, 2021	
5	MF	(Argentina) Eric Remedi	(United States) San Jose Earthquakes	Trade	US	$500K GAM	February 15, 2021	
15	FW	(Argentina) Lisandro López	(Argentina) Racing Club	Released	Non-US	Free	May 18, 2021	
26	DF	(England) Jack Gurr	(Scotland) Aberdeen	Waived	US	Free	May 28, 2021	
—	DF	(Argentina) Fernando Meza	(Mexico) Necaxa	Contract Terminated	Non-US	Free	July 23, 2021	

=== Loan Out ===
No.	Pos.	Player	Loaned to	Start	End	Source
2	DF	(Argentina) Franco Escobar	(Argentina) Newell's Old Boys	February 9, 2021	December 31, 2021	
6	DF	(Argentina) Fernando Meza	(Argentina) Defensa y Justicia	February 18, 2021	June 30, 2021	
—	DF	(United States) Andrew Gutman	(United States) New York Red Bulls	March 9, 2021	December 31, 2021	
35	DF	(United States) Efrain Morales	(United States) Atlanta United 2	April 16, 2021	December 31, 2021	

=== Non-player transfers ===
Acquired	From	For	Source
2021 international roster spot	(United States) Nashville SC	$175K GAM	
#1 pick in 2020 MLS Re-Entry Draft	(United States) FC Cincinnati	$75K GAM and #4 pick in 2020 Re-Entry Draft	
$125K GAM & No. 31 overall pick in SuperDraft	(United States) D.C. United	No. 5 and No. 32 overall picks in SuperDraft	
2021 international roster spot	(United States) Colorado Rapids	$225K GAM in 2022	
