= Franco Ibarra =

Argentine footballer (born 2001)

Personal information
- Full name: Franco Gabriel Ibarra
- Date of birth: 28 April 2001 (age 25)
- Place of birth: Tigre, Argentina
- Height: 1.75 m (5 ft 9 in)
- Position: Defensive midfielder

Team information
- Current team: Rosario Central
- Number: 5

Youth career
- 2010–2019: Argentinos Juniors

Senior career*
Years	Team	Apps	(Gls)
2019–2021	Argentinos Juniors	11	(0)
2021–2024	Atlanta United	53	(0)
2023	→ Toronto FC (loan)	7	(0)
2024	→ Rosario Central (loan)	30	(0)
2025–	Rosario Central	48	(1)

International career
2019	Argentina U18		
- * Club domestic league appearances and goals as of 17:02, 10 July 2026 (UTC)

Franco Gabriel Ibarra (born 28 April 2001) is an Argentine professional footballer who plays as a defensive midfielder for Argentine Primera División club Rosario Central.

== Club career ==
=== Argentinos Juniors ===
Ibarra arrived in Argentinos Juniors in 2010, aged nine. He would go on to make over one hundred competitive appearances in their youth system. Ibarra made his breakthrough into first-team football in December 2019, coming off the bench to replace Francis Mac Allister in a Primera División draw at home to Estudiantes. June 2020 saw Ibarra sign a new contract that would last until December 2024. His next appearance wouldn't arrive until 31 October 2020 against San Lorenzo, though the defensive midfielder would leave the match prematurely after receiving a red card; as he would again nine games later versus Boca Juniors; his final appearance.

=== Atlanta United ===
On 22 February 2021, Ibarra signed with Major League Soccer club Atlanta United with a release clause amounting to €1,700,000 and his contract is valid until 2026.

=== Toronto FC ===
In July 2023, Ibarra was loaned to Major League Soccer club Toronto FC for six months with Atlanta receiving $50,000 in General Allocation Money. The loan comes as a result of a logjam with the U-22 initiative roster slots, with the returns of Erik Lopez and Edwin Mosquera, there were four U-22 players with only three allotted spots.

== International career ==
Ibarra represented Argentina's U18s at the 2019 COTIF Tournament.

== Career statistics ==
As of match played 7 October 2023

Appearances and goals by club, season and competition
Club	Season	League			National cup		League cup		Continental		Other		Total	
Club	Season	Division	Apps	Goals	Apps	Goals	Apps	Goals	Apps	Goals	Apps	Goals	Apps	Goals
Argentinos Juniors	2019–20	Argentine Primera División	1	0	0	0	0	0	0	0	0	0	1	0
Argentinos Juniors	2021 (Note: Soccerway counts Copa de la Liga Profesional appearances as league appearances.)	Argentine Primera División	10	0	0	0	0	0	—		0	0	10	0
Argentinos Juniors	Total		11	0	0	0	0	0	0	0	0	0	11	0
Atlanta United	2021	Major League Soccer	16	0	0	0	—		3 (Note: Appearances in CONCACAF Champions League)	0	0	0	19	0
Atlanta United	2022	Major League Soccer	20	0	2	0	—		—		—		22	0
Atlanta United	2023	Major League Soccer	17	0	1	0	—		—		—		18	0
Atlanta United	Total		53	0	3	0	0	0	3	0	0	0	59	0
Toronto FC (loan)	2023	Major League Soccer	7	0	—		—		—		1 (Note: Appearance in Leagues Cup)	0	8	0
Career total			71	0	3	0	0	0	3	0	1	0	78	0

== Honours ==
Rosario Central

- Primera División: 2025 Liga
- Supercopa Internacional: 2026
