= Brooks Lennon =

American soccer player (born 1997)

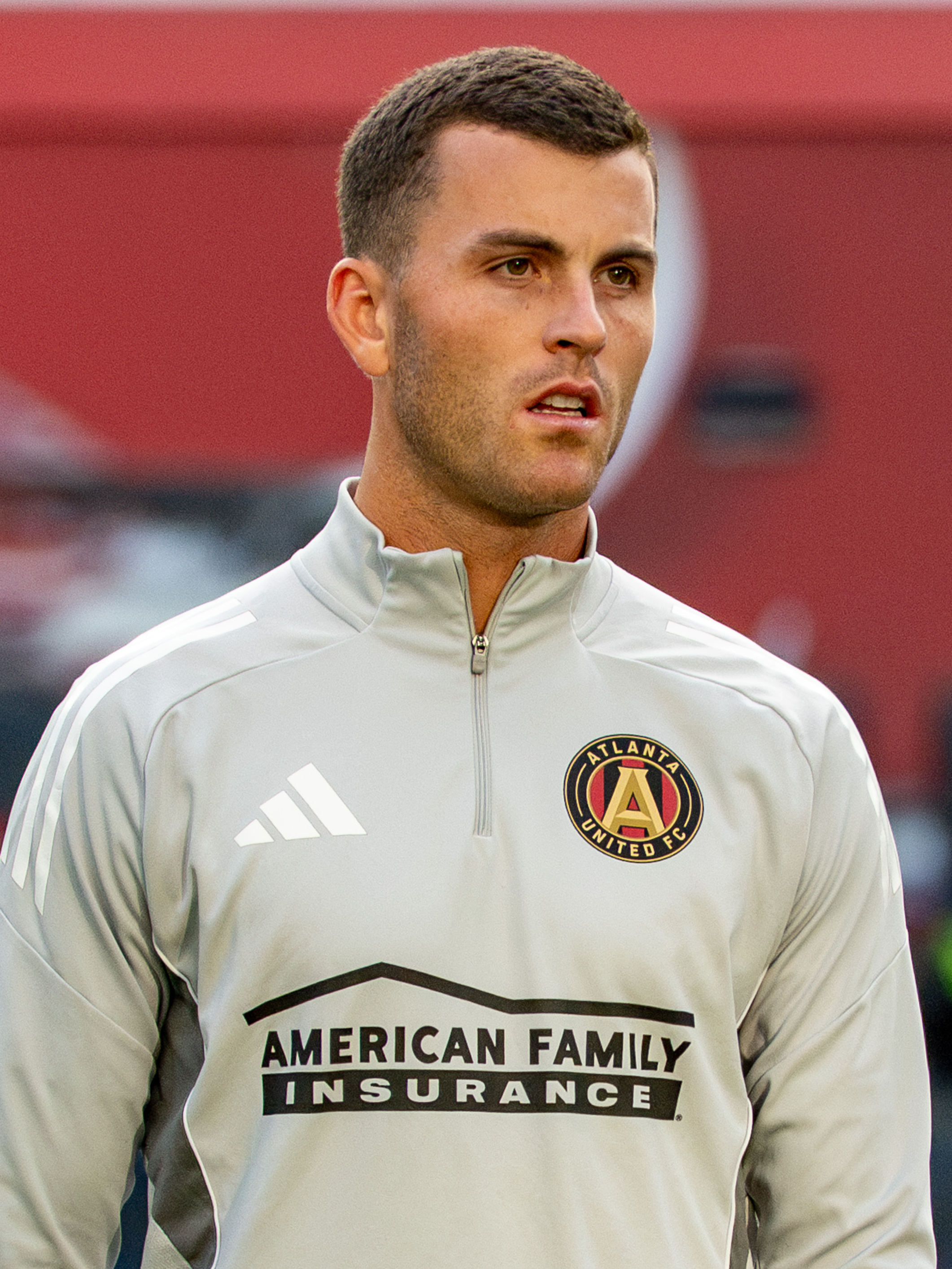
- Lennon in 2025

Personal information
- Full name: Brooks Howard Lennon
- Date of birth: September 22, 1997 (age 29)
- Place of birth: Paradise Valley, Arizona, United States
- Height: 5 ft 10 in (1.78 m)
- Positions: Right-back; winger

Team information
- Current team: Columbus Crew
- Number: 11

Youth career
- 2012–2015: Real Salt Lake AZ
- 2015–2017: Liverpool

Senior career*
| Years | Team | Apps | (Gls) |
| 2017–2018 | Liverpool | 0 | (0) |
| 2017 | → Real Salt Lake (loan) | 25 | (3) |
| 2018–2019 | Real Salt Lake | 61 | (0) |
| 2019 | Real Monarchs | 1 | (0) |
| 2020–2025 | Atlanta United | 171 | (9) |
| 2026– | Columbus Crew | 13 | (0) |

International career^{‡}
| 2013 | United States U17 | 6 | (7) |
| 2014–2015 | United States U18 | 3 | (1) |
| 2015–2017 | United States U20 | 11 | (6) |
| 2019 | United States U23 | 3 | (2) |
| 2021 | United States | 1 | (0) |
Medal record
Representing United States
| First place | CONCACAF U-20 Championship | 2017 |
- * Club domestic league appearances and goals as of November 8, 2026 ‡ National team caps and goals as of December 18, 2021

Brooks Howard Lennon (born September 22, 1997) is an American professional soccer player who plays as a winger or right-back who plays for Major League Soccer club Columbus Crew.

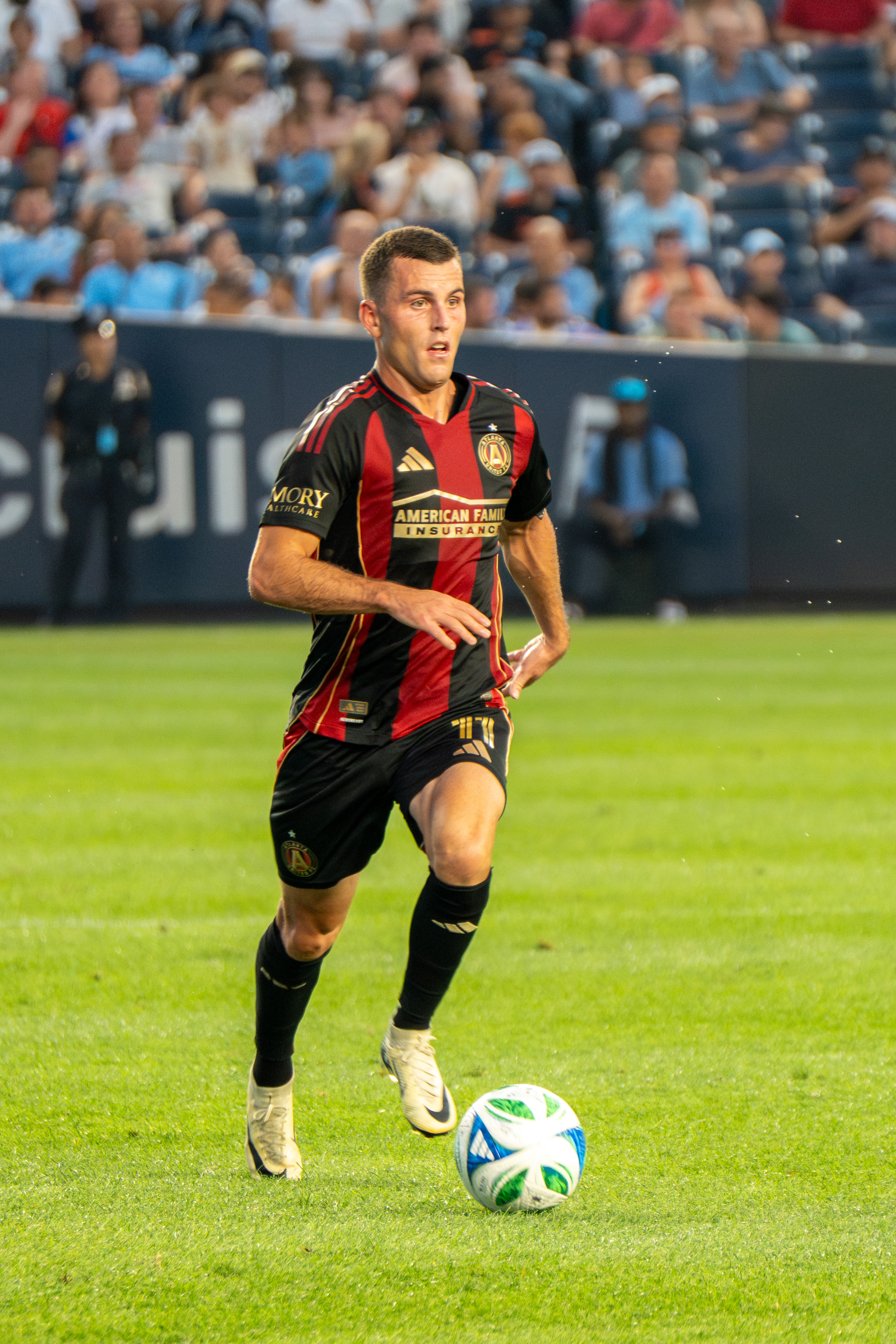
Brooks Lennon during New York City FC vs Atlanta United in 2025

== Club career ==
As a teenager, Lennon played with the Real Salt Lake youth academy in Arizona. He signed with English team Liverpool in 2015, and joined their youth teams. Lennon returned to Real Salt Lake in early 2017, ahead of agreeing a season-long loan with the club. Initially expected to play a developmental role, injuries to key starters thrust Lennon into the starting lineup as the season progressed.

On December 20, 2017, it was announced that Lennon would join Real Salt Lake on a permanent basis. During the 2018 season, he made an appearance at rightback in an early defeat, eventually establishing himself as the club's starter at the position.

On December 2, 2019, Atlanta United acquired Lennon from Real Salt Lake in exchange for $150,000 in General Allocation Money and $150,000 in Targeted Allocation Money. He made his competitive debut for the club in early 2020, appearing in Atlanta's 3–0 victory over Motagua in the opening stages of the CONCACAF Champions Cup. Lennon quickly established himself as a starter, growing into a more advanced leadership role by the time he reached his third season with the club in 2022. In November 2022, he signed a three-year contract extension with Atlanta. In November 2025, the club declined a further contract option, and Lennon became a free agent.

On June 9, 2026, Lennon signed a one-year deal with Columbus Crew as a free agent.

== International career ==
Lennon won the 2017 CONCACAF U-20 Championship with the United States.

On January 8, 2018, Lennon received a call-up for the United States men's national soccer team for a friendly against Bosnia and Herzegovina.

On January 21, 2022, Lennon was called into his first World Cup Qualifying camp with the U.S. Men's Senior team.

== Career statistics ==
=== Club ===
As of match played April 6, 2024

Appearances and goals by club, season and competition
| Club | Season | League | | | National cup | | Playoffs | | Continental | | Total | |
| Club | Season | Division | Apps | Goals | Apps | Goals | Apps | Goals | Apps | Goals | Apps | Goals |
|---|---|---|---|---|---|---|---|---|---|---|---|---|
| Real Salt Lake (loan) | 2017 | Major League Soccer | 25 | 3 | 1 | 0 | — | | — | | 26 | 3 |
| Real Salt Lake | 2018 | Major League Soccer | 33 | 0 | 1 | 0 | 3 | 0 | — | | 37 | 0 |
| Real Salt Lake | 2019 | Major League Soccer | 28 | 0 | — | | — | | 1 (Note: Appearance(s) in Leagues Cup) | 0 | 29 | 0 |
| Real Salt Lake | Total | | 86 | 3 | 2 | 0 | 3 | 0 | 1 | 0 | 92 | 3 |
| Real Monarchs | 2019 | USL Championship | 1 | 0 | — | | — | | — | | 1 | 0 |
| Atlanta United | 2020 | Major League Soccer | 23 | 2 | — | | — | | 3 (Note: Appearance(s) in CONCACAF Champions League) | 0 | 26 | 2 |
| Atlanta United | 2021 | Major League Soccer | 32 | 0 | — | | 1 | 0 | 3 | 0 | 36 | 0 |
| Atlanta United | 2022 | Major League Soccer | 25 | 2 | 2 | 1 | — | | — | | 27 | 3 |
| Atlanta United | 2023 | Major League Soccer | 33 | 4 | — | | 3 | 0 | 2 | 0 | 38 | 4 |
| Atlanta United | 2024 | Major League Soccer | 33 | 0 | 2 | 0 | 2 | 1 | 2 | 0 | 39 | 1 |
| Atlanta United | Total | | 146 | 8 | 4 | 1 | 6 | 1 | 10 | 0 | 166 | 10 |
| Career total | | | 233 | 11 | 6 | 1 | 9 | 1 | 11 | 0 | 259 | 13 |

=== International ===
As of match played December 18, 2021

Appearances and goals by national team and year
| National team | Year | Apps | Goals |
|---|---|---|---|
| United States | 2021 | 1 | 0 |
| Total | | 1 | 0 |

== Honors ==
United States U20

- CONCACAF U-20 Championship: 2017

Individual

- CONCACAF U-20 Championship Best XI: 2017
