= Josef Martínez =

Venezuelan footballer (born 1993)

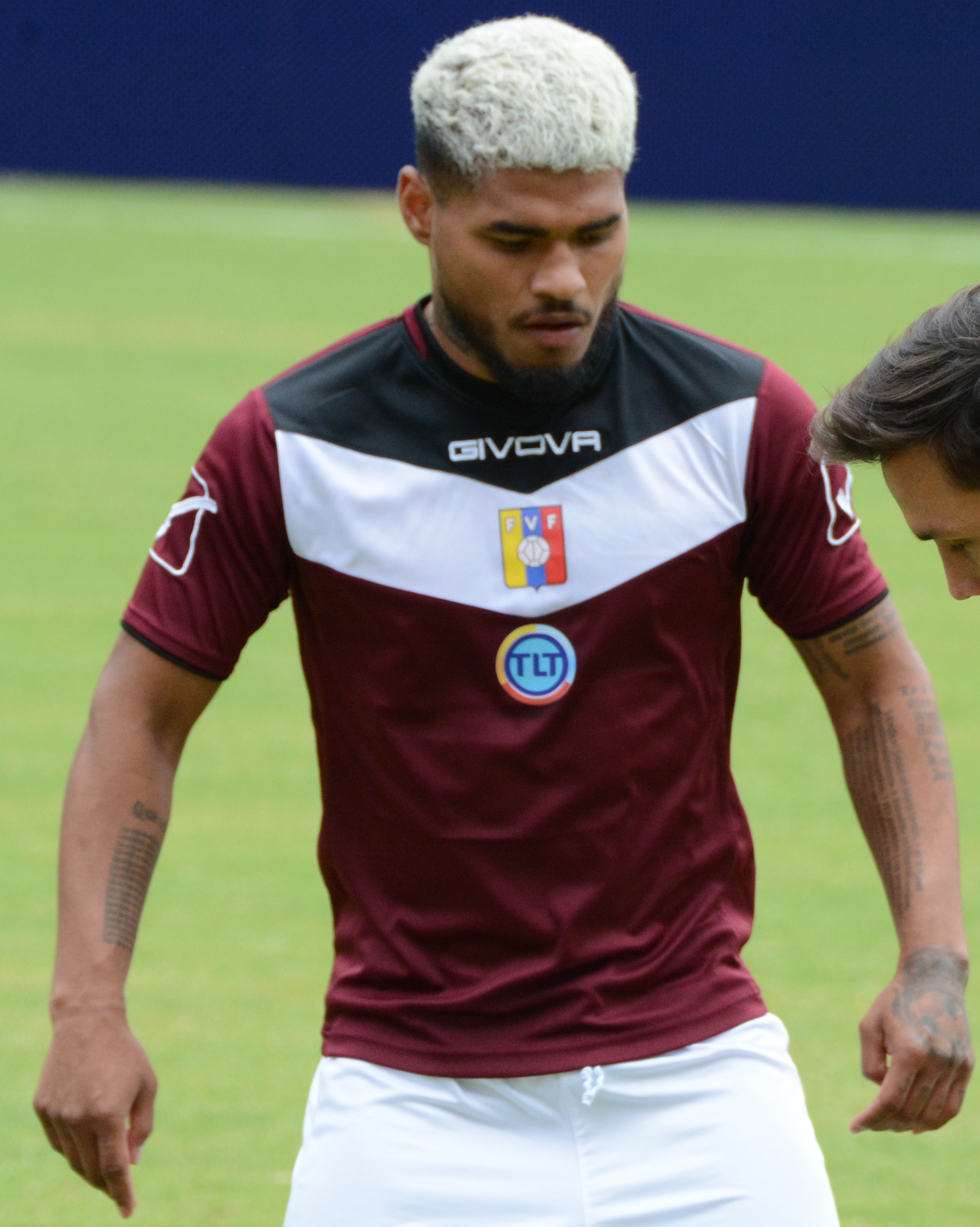
- Martínez with Venezuela in 2019

Personal information
- Full name: Josef Alexander Martínez Mencia
- Date of birth: 19 May 1993 (age 33)
- Place of birth: Valencia, Carabobo, Venezuela
- Height: 1.72 m (5 ft 8 in)
- Position: Striker

Team information
- Current team: Columbus Crew
- Number: 77

Youth career
- –2010: Caracas

Senior career*
Years	Team	Apps	(Gls)
2010–2012	Caracas	36	(8)
2012–2014	Young Boys	37	(4)
2013–2014	→ Thun (loan)	18	(8)
2014–2017	Torino	58	(7)
2017	→ Atlanta United (loan)	3	(5)
2017–2022	Atlanta United	131	(93)
2023	Inter Miami	27	(7)
2024	CF Montréal	23	(11)
2025	San Jose Earthquakes	30	(14)
2026	Tijuana	9	(1)
2026–	Columbus Crew	12	(1)

International career^{‡}
2011–2013	Venezuela U20	4	(2)
2011–	Venezuela	70	(15)
- * Club domestic league appearances and goals as of 31 October 2026 ‡ National team caps and goals as of 23:25, 10 September 2025 (UTC)

Josef Alexander Martínez Mencia (born 19 May 1993) is a Venezuelan professional footballer who plays as a striker for Major League Soccer club Columbus Crew and the Venezuela national team.

Josef Martínez began his career with Caracas. In 2012, he was acquired by the Swiss Super League club Young Boys before spending a year on loan at Thun. In 2014, he was sold to Italian club Torino, and in 2017, Major League Soccer expansion side, Atlanta United. He later joined Inter Miami for the 2023 season. He holds the MLS record for career hat-tricks with six in his first 44 games, the record for cumulative goals in regular and post season with 35, the record for most consecutive games with a goal (15), and formerly held the record for goals in a single season (31 in 2018). Additionally, Martínez scored 100 goals in the MLS faster than any single player in league history (125 games).

In 2018, Martínez became the most decorated single-season player in MLS history by winning the League MVP, All-Star Game MVP, Golden Boot, and MLS Cup Final MVP. He is regarded as one of the greatest players in MLS history, and the greatest player in Atlanta United history.

He is a former Venezuela under-20 international. In 2011, he made his debut for the senior Venezuela national team against El Salvador, and has since represented his nation at three editions of the Copa América.

== Club career ==
=== Caracas ===
Martínez made his debut for Caracas on 21 August 2010 against Estudiantes de Mérida, entering as a substitute in the 70th minute, won 1–0. He scored his first goal in a 2–2 draw against Deportivo Petare on 21 November 2010.

=== Young Boys ===
On 3 January 2012, Caracas announced Martínez had been sold to Young Boys of the Swiss Super League for a period of four years along with fellow right-back Alexander Gonzalez. He debuted on 5 February 2012 against Servette, which the Young Boys won 3–1. After a string of good performances, Martínez was called up to the Venezuela national team, as well as awarded his first start for Young Boys on 21 October 2012, in which he scored his first goal for the Swiss club with a volley in the 50th minute against Grasshoppers.

==== Loan to Thun ====
After one season in the Swiss capital city, he was sent on loan to Thun. After scoring eight goals in 18 games with the team from Bernese Oberland, he was momentarily the top scorer in the Swiss Super League and recalled by Young Boys.

=== Torino ===
On 7 June 2014, Martínez was sold to Italian Serie A club Torino for a reported fee of €3 million. He made his debut in a 0–3 away win against Sweden's Brommapojkarna in the third round of the 2014–15 Europa League. He scored his first goal for the Granata in the return leg, won 4–0 in Turin (7–0 on aggregate).

He made his league debut on 14 September in a 2–0 loss away to Sampdoria. On 7 December, he scored his first goal in Serie A during a 2–2 draw with Palermo. Four days later, he scored his first brace in the Europa League against Copenhagen, which ended 5–1 in favour of Torino.

On 30 April 2016, he scored his first brace in Serie A, as Torino won 5–1 away to Udinese.

=== Atlanta United ===
On 2 February 2017, Martínez was loaned with a buying option to Major League Soccer expansion team Atlanta United. He made his league debut on 5 March in a 2–1 home defeat against New York Red Bulls. He scored his first career hat-trick, and the first hat-trick in the history of the club, in a 6–1 win at Minnesota United the following week.

On 21 March, Atlanta announced they had activated the buyout clause for an undisclosed transfer fee. He was named the MLS Player of the Month for March after scoring five goals in his first three games in the league.

On 23 March, while playing for the Venezuela national team against Peru, Martínez injured his left quadricep. After more than two months of recuperation, he returned to action only to be injured again over the summer. Upon his return from the second injury, he scored hat tricks in two consecutive games against the New England Revolution and Orlando City, and was named the MLS Player of the Month for September 2017. Atlanta United finished in a tie for third in the Eastern Conference, but were eliminated in the first round of the MLS Cup Playoffs by Columbus Crew. Despite only making 20 appearances (all competitions) due to injury, Martínez finished his first year in Atlanta fourth in the league in scoring, with 20 goals in all competitions, and was named to the MLS Best XI for the 2017 season.

==== 2018 season ====
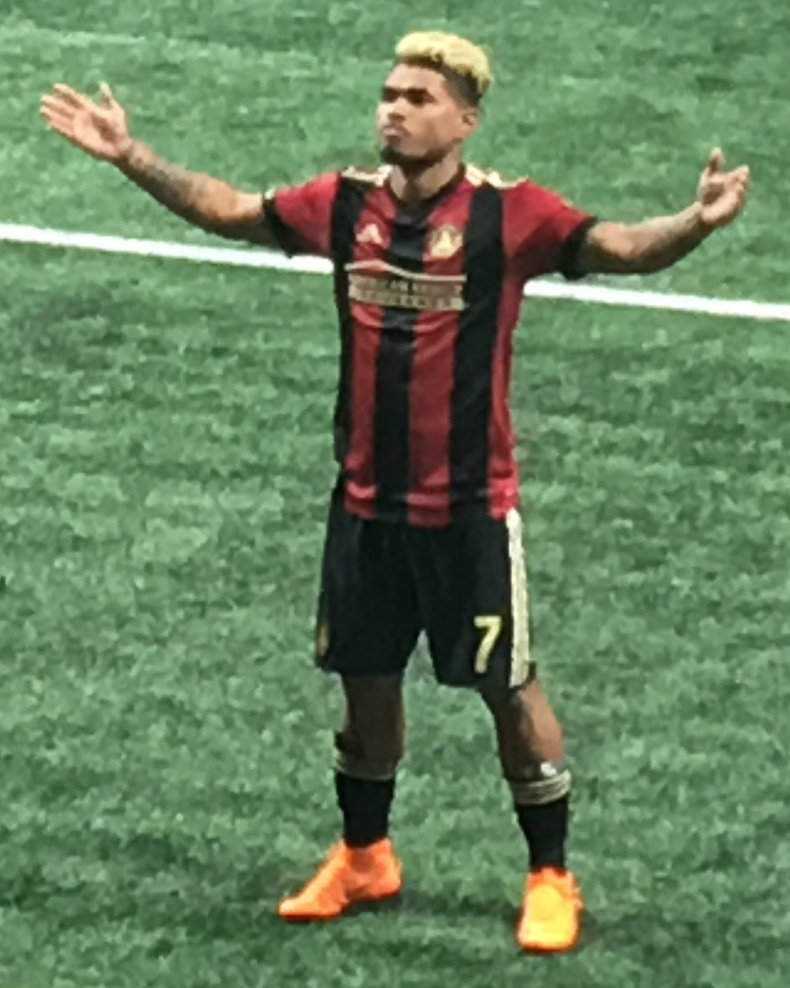
Josef Martinez in 2018

On 2 June 2018, Martínez converted a late penalty kick against Philadelphia Union to notch his fifth MLS hat-trick, tying the league record for hat-tricks and doing so faster than any other player in league history. He broke the record for hat-tricks on 21 July 2018 against DC United, after only 44 games.

He was voted the MLS Player of the Month for July after scoring ten goals and adding one assist to lead the Five Stripes to a 3–1–1 record.

He scored the only goal for the MLS All-Stars in the 2018 MLS All-Star Game against Juventus, a 1–1 draw, and was named MVP.

On 24 August 2018, he scored his 28th goal of the season, a game winner in Orlando City, to break the league single-season record of 27, held by Roy Lassiter, Chris Wondolowski, and Bradley Wright-Phillips. After failing to capitalize on numerous opportunities, Martínez utilized his quick footwork to cut back against the defender and then chip Joe Bendik to set the record in just his 26th match. He was named MLS Player of the Month for August 2018. Atlanta United went on to win the MLS Cup that season, with Martínez scoring in the final against the Portland Timbers and being named the match's most valuable player.

==== 2019 season ====
On 6 August 2019, Martínez was awarded the MLS Player of the Month for July. He earned the award having scored in nine straight matches, tying his own MLS record set the previous season, which was also shared with Diego Valeri.

On 23 August, he set a new MLS record by scoring a goal in 12 consecutive games. The goal helped his side to a 1–0 win over rivals Orlando City and was his 15th strike during the streak. On 18 September, Martínez extended his goal-scoring record to 15 consecutive games, which is the third longest streak in world football after Lionel Messi (33 goals in 21 games) and Tor Henning Hamre (21 goals in 15 games).

==== 2020 season ====
On 29 February 2020, in Atlanta United’s first game of the 2020 season, Martínez suffered a torn ACL against MLS debutant Nashville. Martínez missed the entirety of the 2020 season.

==== 2021 season ====
Martínez made his first appearance since early last season on 6 April 2021 in the CONCACAF Champions League against Alajuelense, coming on as a 67th minute substitute in the 1–0 away victory. On 9 May 2021, Martínez scored his first goal of the season in a 1–1 draw against Inter Miami. In July 2021, after returning from Copa América, it was revealed by coach Gabriel Heinze that Martínez was training away from the team, with no specific reason given. Heinze was removed as Atlanta United's coach on 18 July and Martínez played his first match since returning on 21 July against FC Cincinnati. He came on as a substitute in the 1–1 draw.

On 30 July 2021, Martínez scored the opening goal for Atlanta United in the first minute of a 3–2 away defeat against Orlando City. He then scored the first goal for Atlanta on 4 August in their 2–2 draw against CF Montréal. Martínez also earned a red card in the 82nd minute following an altercation with Montréal's Victor Wanyama. He returned to the side on 15 August, scoring the only goal in a 1–0 home victory against Los Angeles FC.

==== 2022 season ====
Martínez scored his first goal of the 2022 season on 13 March 2022. After a second successful knee surgery, he started his first game since April, where he went on to score a goal and assisted another.

At the end of the season, after winning the award for the 2022 MLS Goal of the Year, Martínez did not renew his contract with Atlanta United, subsequently leaving the club after six seasons after falling out, and eventually being frozen out of the team by manager Gonzalo Pineda.

=== Inter Miami ===
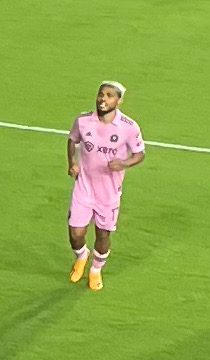
Josef Martinez playing for Inter Miami in the 2023 U.S. Open Cup

On 18 January 2023, it was announced that Martínez had been traded to Inter Miami. Martínez made his 2023 Inter Miami season debut in a match against CF Montréal on 25 February 2023, ending in a 2–0 win.

On 19 August, Inter Miami won the 2023 Leagues Cup, with Martínez scoring three goals in the competition. Later on, Inter Miami went to the 2023 U.S. Open Cup final, where they lost 1–2 against the Houston Dynamo, with Martínez scoring the only goal.

On 21 October, Inter Miami's head coach, Gerardo Martino, confirmed that Martínez would leave Inter Miami after only one season. Four days later, the club confirmed the player's departure.

=== CF Montréal ===
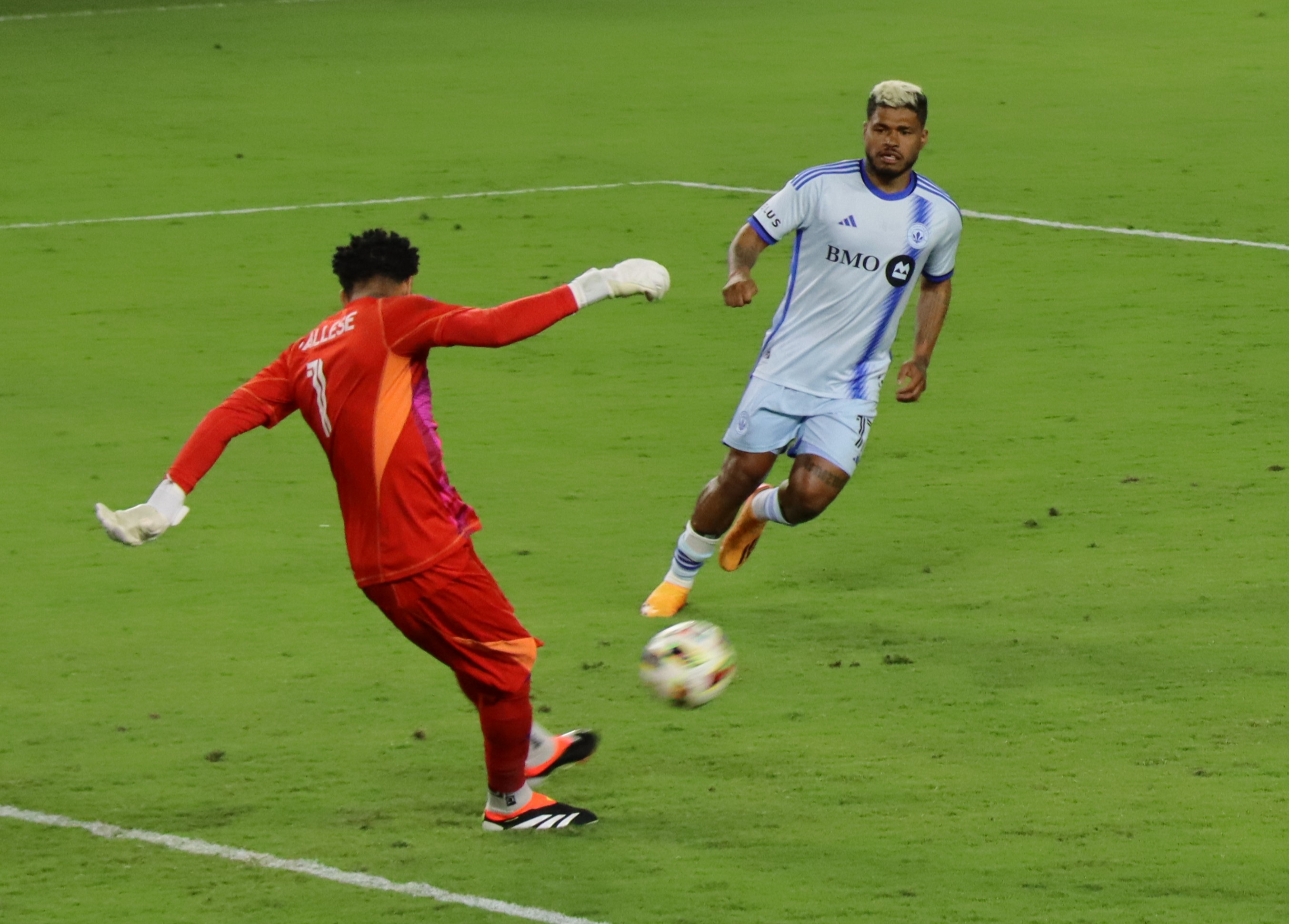
Martínez pressing against Pedro Gallese for CF Montréal in 2024

On 6 February 2024, CF Montréal announced that they had signed Martínez as a free agent for the 2024 season with an option for a further year. Though his option was declined he tallied a total of 13 goals and 3 assists.

=== San Jose Earthquakes ===
On 13 January 2025, Martínez joined San Jose Earthquakes as a free agent, signing a one-year deal.

=== Tijuana ===
In January 2026, he signed with Liga MX club Tijuana. He and Tijuana mutually agreed to part ways in July 2026.

=== Columbus Crew ===
After being released by Tijuana, Martínez returned to Major League Soccer, signing a contract with the Columbus Crew on 13 August 2026.

== International career ==
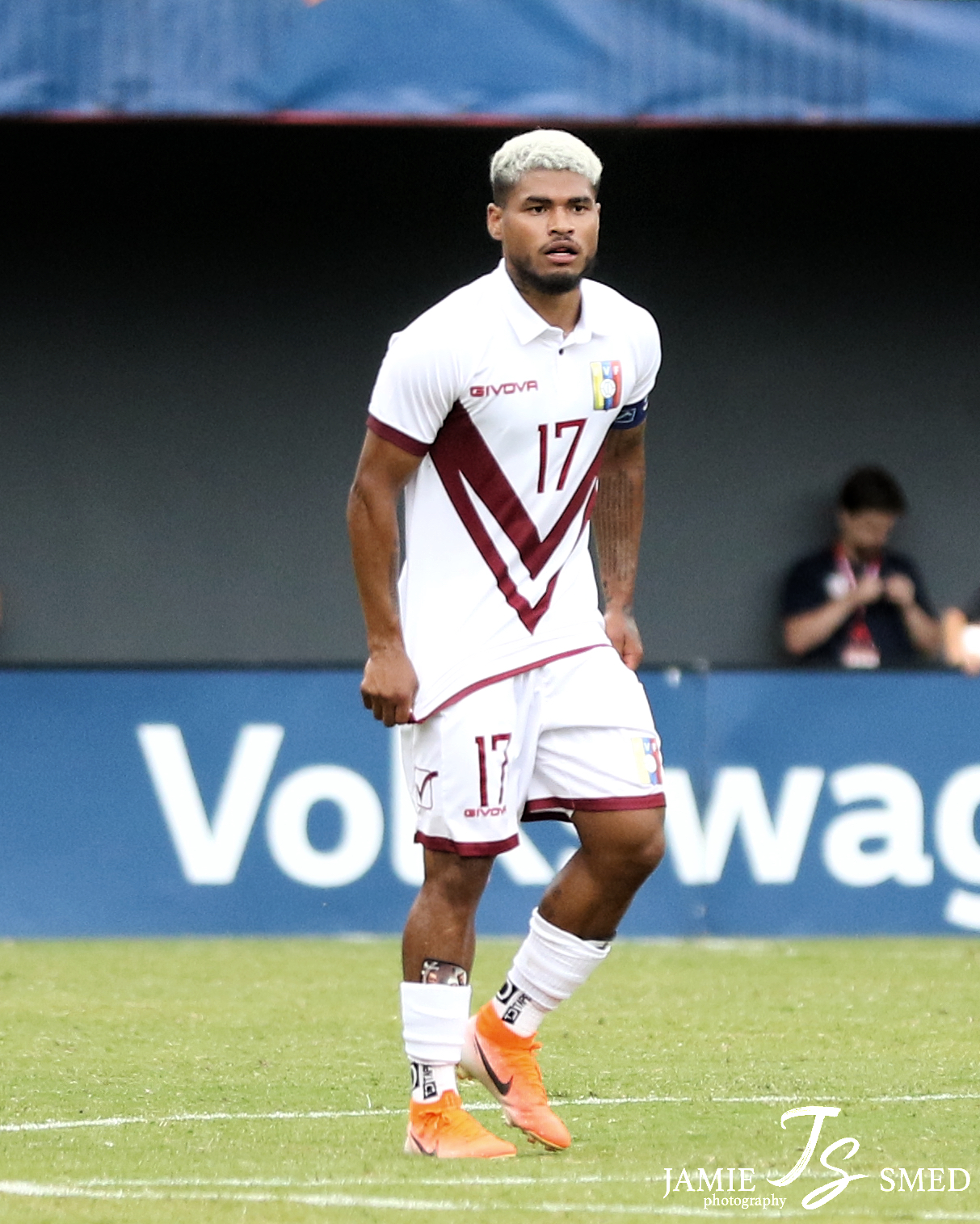
Martínez playing for Venezuela in 2019.

Martínez made his international debut on 7 August 2011 against El Salvador as a substitute in the 76th minute.

On 10 November 2016 (matchday 11 of the 2018 FIFA World Cup qualification), Martínez scored a hat-trick against Bolivia in a 5–0 win in Maturín.

== Style of play ==
While he started as a winger, a position in which he often played at Torino under manager Siniša Mihajlović, it was his Atlanta coach Gerardo Martino who changed his position, converting him into a center forward. Primarily a forward, Martínez is an aggressive and powerful player, who usually plays in a central role as a main striker, but who is also capable of playing as a winger. His pace, dribbling ability, eye for goal, and his accurate finishing ability with either foot, as well as his head, combined with his ability to make attacking runs off the ball from behind and get into good positions, make him a dangerous attacking threat in the penalty area.

== Career statistics ==
=== Club ===
As of match played 21 November 2026

Appearances and goals by club, season and competition
Club	Season	League			National cup (Note: Includes Swiss Cup, Coppa Italia, U.S. Open Cup)		Continental		Other		Total	
Club	Season	Division	Apps	Goals	Apps	Goals	Apps	Goals	Apps	Goals	Apps	Goals
Caracas	2010–11	Venezuelan Primera División	21	4	—		7 (Note: Five appearances and one goal in Copa Libertadores, two appearances in Copa Sudamericana)	1	—		28	5
Caracas	2011–12	Venezuelan Primera División	15	4	—		0	0	—		15	4
Caracas	Total		36	8	—		7	1	—		43	9
Young Boys	2011–12	Swiss Super League	11	0	0	0	—		—		11	0
Young Boys	2012–13	Swiss Super League	8	1	1	0	—		—		9	1
Young Boys	2013–14	Swiss Super League	18	3	0	0	—		—		18	3
Young Boys	Total		37	4	1	0	—		—		38	4
Thun	2013–14	Swiss Super League	18	8	3	1	11 (Note: Appearances in UEFA Europa League)	1	—		32	10
Torino	2014–15	Serie A	26	3	1	1	13	3	—		40	7
Torino	2015–16	Serie A	21	3	2	1	—		—		23	4
Torino	2016–17	Serie A	11	1	1	1	—		—		12	2
Torino	Total		58	7	4	3	13	3	—		75	13
Atlanta United	2017	MLS	20	19	1	1	—		1 (Note: Appearances in MLS Cup playoffs)	0	22	20
Atlanta United	2018	MLS	34	31	—		—		5	4	39	35
Atlanta United	2019	MLS	29	27	2	1	5 (Note: Four appearances and three goals in CONCACAF Champions League, one appearance and one goal in Campeones Cup)	4	3	1	39	33
Atlanta United	2020	MLS	1	0	—		2 (Note: Appearances in CONCACAF Champions League)	2	—		3	2
Atlanta United	2021	MLS	24	12	—		4	0	1	0	29	12
Atlanta United	2022	MLS	26	9	0	0	—		—		26	9
Atlanta United	Total		134	98	3	2	11	6	10	5	158	111
Inter Miami	2023	MLS	27	7	6	2	—		7 (Note: Appearances in Leagues Cup)	3	40	12
CF Montréal	2024	MLS	23	11	0	0	—		3 (Note: Two appearances and one goal in Leagues Cup, one appearance and two goals in MLS Cup playoffs)	3	26	14
San Jose Earthquakes	2025	MLS	30	14	1	0	—		—		31	14
Tijuana	2025–26	Liga MX	9	1	—		—		—		9	1
Columbus Crew	2026	MLS	12	1	2	1	—		1	0	15	2
Career total			384	159	20	9	42	11	21	11	467	190

=== International ===
As of match played 9 September 2025

Appearances and goals by national team and year
National team	Year	Apps	Goals
Venezuela	2011	3	0
Venezuela	2012	3	0
Venezuela	2013	6	2
Venezuela	2014	3	0
Venezuela	2015	7	2
Venezuela	2016	15	5
Venezuela	2017	5	0
Venezuela	2018	3	0
Venezuela	2019	6	2
Venezuela	2020	0	0
Venezuela	2021	4	0
Venezuela	2022	5	2
Venezuela	2023	6	1
Venezuela	2024	0	0
Venezuela	2025	4	1
Total		70	15

As of match played 9 September 2025
Scores and results list Venezuela's goal tally first, score column indicates score after each Martínez goal.

List of international goals scored by Josef Martínez
No.	Date	Venue	Cap	Opponent	Score	Result	Competition
1	22 May 2013	Estadio José Pachencho Romero, Maracaibo, Venezuela	7	El Salvador	2–1	2–1	Friendly
2	14 August 2013	Estadio José Pachencho Romero, Maracaibo, Venezuela	9	Bolivia	1–0	2–2	Friendly
3	31 March 2015	Lockhart Stadium, Fort Lauderdale, United States	17	Peru	1–0	1–0	Friendly
4	17 November 2015	Estadio Cachamay, Ciudad Guayana, Venezuela	22	Ecuador	1–3	1–3	2018 FIFA World Cup qualification
5	5 June 2016	Soldier Field, Chicago, United States	28	Jamaica	1–0	1–0	Copa América Centenario
6	6 September 2016	Estadio Metropolitano de Mérida, Mérida, Venezuela	33	Argentina	2–0	2–2	2018 FIFA World Cup qualification
7	10 November 2016	Estadio Monumental, Maturín, Venezuela	36	Bolivia	2–0	5–0	2018 FIFA World Cup qualification
8	10 November 2016	Estadio Monumental, Maturín, Venezuela	36	Bolivia	3–0	5–0	2018 FIFA World Cup qualification
9	10 November 2016	Estadio Monumental, Maturín, Venezuela	36	Bolivia	4–0	5–0	2018 FIFA World Cup qualification
10	22 March 2019	Wanda Metropolitano, Madrid, Spain	46	Argentina	3–1	3–1	Friendly
11	22 June 2019	Estádio Mineirão, Belo Horizonte, Brazil	50	Bolivia	3–1	3–1	2019 Copa América
12	1 February 2022	Estadio Centenario, Montevideo, Uruguay	57	Uruguay	1–4	1–4	2022 FIFA World Cup qualification
13	27 September 2022	Stadion Wiener Neustadt, Wiener Neustadt, Austria	60	United Arab Emirates	4–0	4–0	Friendly
14	25 March 2023	Prince Abdullah Al Faisal Stadium, Jeddah, Saudi Arabia	61	Saudi Arabia	1–0	2–1	Friendly
15	9 September 2025	Estadio Monumental, Maturín, Venezuela	70	Colombia	2–1	3–6	2026 FIFA World Cup qualification

== Honours ==
Atlanta United

- MLS Cup: 2018
- Eastern Conference (Playoffs): 2018
- U.S. Open Cup: 2019
- Campeones Cup: 2019

Inter Miami

- Leagues Cup: 2023

Individual

- Swiss Super League Team of the Year: 2013–14
- MLS Best XI: 2017, 2018, 2019
- MLS Most Valuable Player: 2018
- MLS Golden Boot: 2018
- MLS All-Star: 2018, 2019
- MLS All-Star Game MVP: 2018
- MLS Player of the Month: March 2017, September 2017, July 2018, August 2018, July 2019, August 2019
- MLS Cup MVP: 2018
- MLS 100 goals club
- MLS Goal of the Year: 2019, 2022
