= Marcelino Moreno =

Argentine footballer (born 1995)

Personal information
- Full name: Damián Marcelino Moreno
- Date of birth: 25 June 1995 (age 31)
- Place of birth: San Martín, Argentina
- Height: 1.68 m (5 ft 6 in)
- Position: Attacking midfielder

Team information
- Current team: Lanús
- Number: 10

Youth career
- Atlético Palmira
- Boca Juniors
- Lanús

Senior career*
| Years | Team | Apps | (Gls) |
| 2015–2020 | Lanús | 85 | (4) |
| 2015 | → Talleres (loan) | 0 | (0) |
| 2020–2023 | Atlanta United | 67 | (13) |
| 2023 | → Coritiba (loan) | 18 | (1) |
| 2023–2024 | Coritiba | 25 | (1) |
| 2024– | Lanús | 78 | (17) |
- * Club domestic league appearances and goals as of 17:13, 6 June 2026 (UTC)

Damián Marcelino Moreno (born 25 June 1995) is an Argentine professional footballer who plays as an attacking midfielder for Argentine Primera División club Lanús.

== Club career ==
=== Lanús ===
Moreno had spells with Atlético Palmira and Boca Juniors during his youth career, prior to moving on to join Lanús where he featured at the 2016 U-20 Copa Libertadores. In 2015, Moreno joined Talleres of Torneo Federal A on loan. However, a year later, Moreno rejoined Argentine Primera División side Lanús after not playing for Talleres' first-team. He made his senior debut for Lanús on 19 July 2016 in a Copa Argentina win over San Martín de Formosa, before making his professional league debut against former club Boca Juniors on 28 August. In his debut season of 2016–17, Moreno featured twenty-eight times in all competitions.

Moreno scored his first senior goal in March 2019 against Belgrano.

=== Atlanta United ===
On 22 September 2020, following one hundred and twelve appearances and six goals for Lanús, Moreno departed to the United States with Major League Soccer team Atlanta United; signing as a designated player for an undisclosed fee. He debuted in a home defeat to the New York Red Bulls on 11 October, which preceded six further appearances in the 2020 campaign; he also netted penalties in November against FC Cincinnati and Columbus Crew SC.

==== Coritiba ====
On 4 January 2023, Coritiba Foot Ball Club announced they had signed Moreno to a loan for the 2023 season. On 20 June, this loan was made permanent.

== Career statistics ==
As of 26 March 2025

Appearances and goals by club, season and competition
| Club | Season | League | | | Cup | | League Cup | | Continental | | Other | | Total | |
| Club | Season | Division | Apps | Goals | Apps | Goals | Apps | Goals | Apps | Goals | Apps | Goals | Apps | Goals |
|---|---|---|---|---|---|---|---|---|---|---|---|---|---|---|
| Lanús | 2016–17 | Primera División | 22 | 0 | 3 | 0 | — | | 3 (Note: Appearance(s) in the Copa Libertadores and Copa Sudamericana) | 0 | — | | 28 | 0 |
| Lanús | 2017–18 | Primera División | 20 | 0 | 1 | 0 | — | | 5 | 0 | — | | 26 | 0 |
| Lanús | 2018–19 | Primera División | 23 | 1 | 3 | 0 | 4 | 1 | 2 (Note: Appearance(s) in the Copa Sudamericana) | 0 | — | | 32 | 2 |
| Lanús | 2019–20 | Primera División | 20 | 3 | 4 | 1 | 1 | 0 | 1 | 0 | — | | 26 | 4 |
| Lanús | Total | | 85 | 4 | 11 | 1 | 5 | 1 | 11 | 0 | — | | 112 | 6 |
| Talleres (loan) | 2015 | Torneo Federal A | 0 | 0 | 0 | 0 | — | | — | | — | | 0 | 0 |
| Atlanta United | 2020 | Major League Soccer | 6 | 2 | — | | — | | 1 (Note: Appearance(s) in the CONCACAF Champions League) | 0 | — | | 7 | 2 |
| Atlanta United | 2021 | Major League Soccer | 32 | 9 | — | | — | | 3 | 0 | 1 | 0 | 36 | 9 |
| Atlanta United | 2022 | Major League Soccer | 30 | 2 | 2 | 1 | — | | — | | — | | 32 | 3 |
| Atlanta United | Total | | 68 | 13 | 2 | 1 | — | | 4 | 0 | 1 | 0 | 75 | 14 |
| Coritiba | 2023 | Série A | 31 | 2 | 2 | 0 | — | | — | | 12 (Note: Appearance(s) in the Campeonato Paranaense) | 0 | 45 | 2 |
| Lanús | 2024 | Primera División | 39 | 9 | 1 | 0 | — | | 12 | 2 | — | | 52 | 11 |
| Lanús | 2025 | Primera División | 10 | 2 | 1 | 2 | — | | 0 | 0 | — | | 11 | 4 |
| Lanús | Total | | 49 | 11 | 2 | 2 | — | | 12 | 2 | — | | 63 | 15 |
| Career total | | | 233 | 30 | 17 | 5 | 5 | 1 | 27 | 2 | 13 | 0 | 295 | 37 |

== Honours ==
Lanús

- Copa Bicentenario: 2016
- Supercopa Argentina: 2016
- Copa Sudamericana: 2025
