= George Campbell (soccer) =

American soccer player (born 2001)

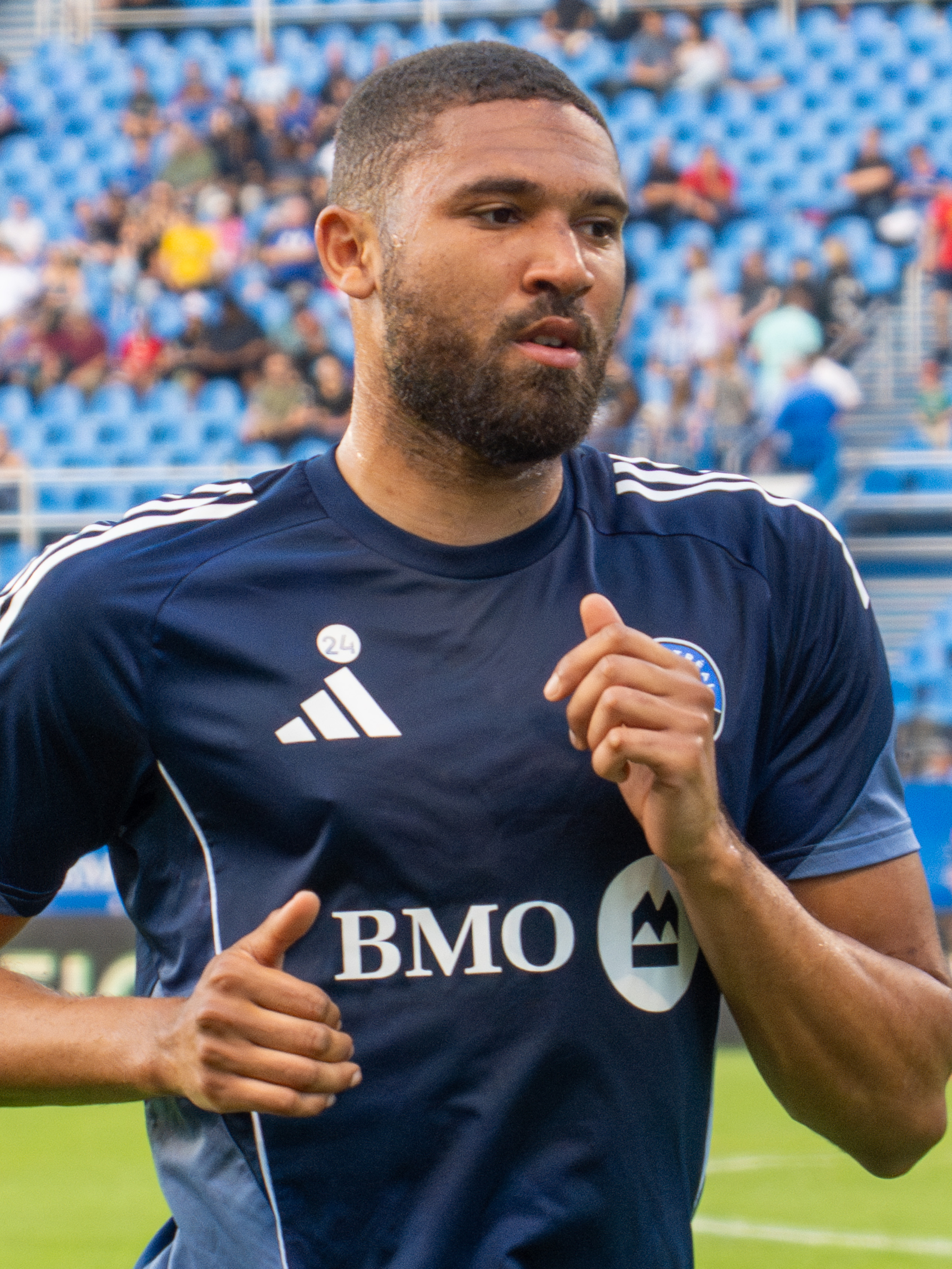
- Campbell with CF Montréal in 2025

Personal information
- Full name: George Hampton Campbell
- Date of birth: June 22, 2001 (age 25)
- Place of birth: Chester, Pennsylvania, U.S.
- Height: 6 ft 2 in (1.88 m)
- Position: Center back

Team information
- Current team: West Bromwich Albion
- Number: 6

Youth career
- 2015–2016: Georgia United
- 2016–2019: Atlanta United

Senior career*
Years	Team	Apps	(Gls)
2018–2022	Atlanta United 2	27	(2)
2020–2022	Atlanta United	36	(1)
2023–2025	CF Montréal	70	(1)
2025–	West Bromwich Albion	49	(4)

International career^{‡}
2023–2024	United States U23	3	(0)
2025–	United States	3	(0)
- * Club domestic league appearances and goals as of October 18, 2026 ‡ National team caps and goals as of October 6, 2026

George Hampton Campbell (born June 22, 2001) is an American professional soccer player who plays as a center back for and captains EFL Championship club West Bromwich Albion. Campbell also plays for the United States national team.

== Career ==
=== Atlanta United ===
Born in Chester, Pennsylvania, Campbell played for Nether United as a kid before his family relocated to Atlanta. He began his career with Georgia United before joining the youth academy at Atlanta United. On March 9, 2019, after impressing with the academy, Campbell made his professional debut for Atlanta United 2, the club's reserve side in the USL Championship, against Hartford Athletic. He started as Atlanta United 2 won 2–0. Campbell then scored his first goal for Atlanta United 2 on September 25 against Indy Eleven, scoring the first in a 2–1 victory.

On July 9, 2019, Campbell signed a homegrown player deal with the Atlanta United first team, effective starting from the 2020 season. He made his debut for Atlanta United on March 7 against FC Cincinnati, coming on as a 44th-minute substitute in a 2–1 victory.

=== CF Montréal ===
On December 13, 2022, Campbell was traded to CF Montréal in exchange for $400,000 in 2023 General Allocation Money and $200,000 in 2024 General Allocation Money, as well as up to $300,000 in conditional General Allocation Money.

=== West Bromwich Albion ===
On July 18, 2025, Campbell signed for Championship club West Bromwich Albion on a four-year deal for an undisclosed fee. Campbell made his debut for West Bromwich Albion as a substitute against Blackburn Rovers on August 9. On December 29, he scored his first goal for the club in a 2–1 victory over Queens Park Rangers at The Hawthorns. In August 2026, Campbell was selected as West Bromwich Albion captain for the 2026/2027 season.

== International career ==
After three youth international team appearances with the United States' under-23 national team, Campbell received his first call-up to the senior men's national team in January 2025. He made his debut for the squad in a 3-1 friendly win over Venezuela on 18 January 2025 at Chase Stadium in Fort Lauderdale, Florida. Campbell played 88 minutes before being replaced by Walker Zimmerman.

== Career statistics ==
=== Club ===
As of October 17, 2026

Appearances and goals by club, season and competition
Club	Season	League			National cup (Note: Includes U.S. Open Cup, Canadian Championship, FA Cup)		League cup (Note: Includes EFL Cup)		Continental		Other		Total	
Club	Season	Division	Apps	Goals	Apps	Goals	Apps	Goals	Apps	Goals	Apps	Goals	Apps	Goals
Atlanta United 2	2019	USL	22	2	—		—		—		—		22	2
Atlanta United 2	2021	USL	5	0	—		—		—		—		5	0
Atlanta United 2	Total		27	2	—		—		—		—		27	2
Atlanta United	2020	MLS	1	0	—		—		—		—		1	0
Atlanta United	2021	MLS	15	1	—		—		1 (Note: Appearances in CONCACAF Champions Cup)	0	—		16	1
Atlanta United	2022	MLS	20	0	1	0	—		—		—		21	0
Atlanta United	Total		36	1	1	0	—		1	0	—		38	1
CF Montréal	2023	MLS	26	1	3	0	—		—		—		29	1
CF Montréal	2024	MLS	28	0	2	0	1	0	—		—		31	0
CF Montréal	2025	MLS	16	0	2	0	0	0	—		0	0	18	0
CF Montréal	Total		70	1	7	0	1	0	—		0	0	78	1
West Bromwich Albion	2025–26	EFL Championship	39	4	1	0	1	0	—		—		41	4
West Bromwich Albion	2026–27	EFL Championship	10	0	0	0	2	0	—		0	0	12	0
West Bromwich Albion	Total		49	4	1	0	3	0	—		0	0	53	4
Career total			181	8	9	0	4	0	1	0	0	0	195	8

=== International ===
As of match played October 6, 2026

Appearances and goals by national team and year
National team	Year	Apps	Goals
United States	2025	1	0
United States	2026	2	0
Total		3	0
