= Tyler Wolff =

American soccer player (born 2003)

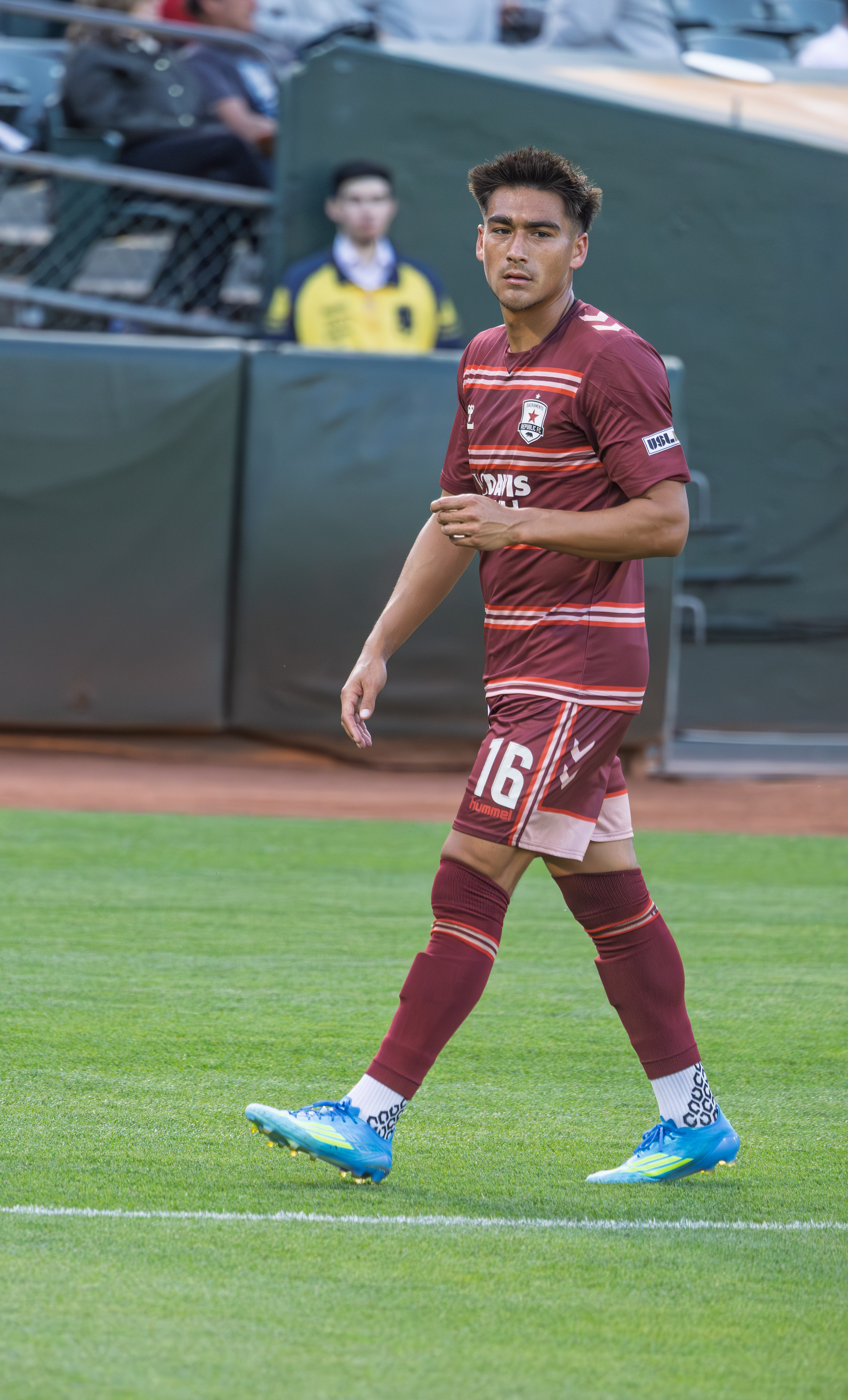
- Wolff with the Sacramento Republic in 2026

Personal information
- Full name: Tyler David Wolff
- Date of birth: February 13, 2003 (age 23)
- Place of birth: Snellville, Georgia, U.S.
- Height: 5 ft 9 in (1.74 m)
- Position: Winger

Team information
- Current team: Sacramento Republic FC (on loan from Real Salt Lake)
- Number: 16

Youth career
- 2015–2019: Columbus Crew
- 2019–2020: Atlanta United

Senior career*
Years	Team	Apps	(Gls)
2020–2024	Atlanta United	53	(6)
2020–2021	→ Atlanta United 2 (loan)	10	(6)
2022–2023	→ Beveren (loan)	5	(0)
2023	→ Atlanta United 2 (loan)	5	(1)
2025–	Real Salt Lake	13	(0)
2025–2026	→ Real Monarchs (loan)	6	(3)
2026–	→ Sacramento Republic FC (loan)	19	(5)

International career^{‡}
2022	United States U20	9	(2)
- * Club domestic league appearances and goals as of November 11, 2026 ‡ National team caps and goals as of July 3, 2022

Tyler David Wolff (born February 13, 2003) is an American professional soccer player who plays as a winger for Sacramento Republic FC on loan from Major League Soccer club Real Salt Lake.

== Career ==
Born in Snellville, Georgia, Wolff began his career in the youth academy at the Columbus Crew. In 2019, Wolff joined the academy at Atlanta United. After impressing with the under-17s, Wolff made his debut for the club's reserve side Atlanta United 2 on August 8, 2020, in the USL Championship against the Charleston Battery. He started and played 62 minutes as Atlanta United 2 were defeated 1–0.

=== Atlanta United ===
On July 2, 2020, Wolff signed a first team contract with Major League Soccer club Atlanta United. Wolff made his debut for the club on September 2 against Inter Miami, coming on as a 63rd-minute substitute for Esequiel Barco in a 0–0 draw. He then scored his first professional goal for Atlanta United 2, the club's reserve affiliate in the USL Championship, on May 15, 2021, against OKC Energy. His goal was an 89th-minute equalizer in a 2–2 away draw. Wolff scored a hat-trick for Atlanta United 2 on August 8, 2021, in a 6–2 victory against Indy Eleven for which he was awarded USL Championship player of the week for week 16 of the 2021 season.

==== SK Beveren (loan) ====
On July 8, 2022, Wolff was loaned to Belgian Challenger Pro League side SK Beveren. After seven substitute appearances, he was recalled on January 4, 2023.

=== Real Salt Lake ===
On December 9, 2024, Real Salt Lake acquired 21-year-old winger Tyler Wolff from Atlanta United FC in exchange for $50,000 in 2026 General Allocation Money. Wolff has signed a contract through 2026 with options for 2027 and 2028.

== Personal life ==
Wolff is the eldest son of former Austin FC head coach (and longtime USMNT player) Josh Wolff, and his younger brother Owen Wolff currently plays for Austin FC. They are of Filipino descent on their mother's side.

== Career statistics ==
=== Club ===
As of match played June 14, 2025

Appearances and goals by club, season and competition
Club	Season	League			National cup (Note: Includes U.S. Open Cup, Belgian Cup)		Continental (Note: Includes CONCACAF Champions Cup)		Other (Note: Includes MLS Cup playoffs, Leagues Cup)		Total	
Club	Season	Division	Apps	Goals	Apps	Goals	Apps	Goals	Apps	Goals	Apps	Goals
Atlanta United	2020	MLS	5	0	—		—		—		5	0
Atlanta United	2021	MLS	7	0	—		—		—		7	0
Atlanta United	2022	MLS	5	0	1	0	—		—		6	0
Atlanta United	2023	MLS	18	5	1	1	—		4	0	23	6
Atlanta United	2024	MLS	18	1	1	0	—		1	0	20	1
Atlanta United	Total		53	6	3	1	—		5	0	61	7
Atlanta United 2 (loan)	2020	USL Championship	1	0	—		—		—		1	0
Atlanta United 2 (loan)	2021	USL Championship	9	6	—		—		—		9	6
Atlanta United 2 (loan)	Total		10	6	—		—		—		10	6
Beveren (loan)	2022–23	Challenger Pro League	5	0	2	0	—		—		7	0
Atlanta United 2 (loan)	2023	MLS Next Pro	5	1	—		—		—		5	1
Real Salt Lake	2025	MLS	9	0	—		2	0	—		11	0
Real Monarchs (loan)	2025	MLS Next Pro	2	2	—		—		—		2	2
Career total			84	15	5	1	2	0	5	0	96	16

== Honors ==
United States U20

- CONCACAF U-20 Championship: 2022
