= Santiago Sosa =

Argentine footballer (born 1999)

Personal information
- Full name: Santiago Leonel Sosa
- Date of birth: 3 May 1999 (age 27)
- Place of birth: La Plata, Argentina
- Height: 6 ft 0 in (1.82 m)
- Position: Midfielder

Team information
- Current team: Vasco da Gama
- Number: 5

Youth career
- Mercedes
- 2008–2018: River Plate

Senior career*
Years	Team	Apps	(Gls)
2018–2021	River Plate	14	(0)
2021–2024	Atlanta United	63	(1)
2024	→ Racing Club (loan)	36	(2)
2025–2026	Racing Club	43	(1)
2026–	Vasco da Gama	6	(0)

International career^{‡}
2019	Argentina U20	12	(0)
- * Club domestic league appearances and goals as of 18:01, 4 October 2026 (UTC) ‡ National team caps and goals as of 4 June 2019

Santiago Leonel Sosa (born 3 May 1999) is an Argentine professional footballer who plays as a defensive midfielder for Campeonato Brasileiro Série A club Vasco da Gama.

== Club career ==
Sosa's career began with Mercedes, before River Plate signed him in 2018. The 2018–19 campaign saw Sosa become a senior member of the club's first-team, he made his professional career debut in a 2018 Copa Libertadores fixture with Racing Club on 29 August 2018; he featured for the remaining sixteen minutes as River Plate won 3–0. He ended the aforementioned season with five total appearances.

In February 2021, Sosa signed with Major League Soccer club Atlanta United. On 6 April 2021, Sosa made his club debut in their 1–0 victory over Alajuelense in the CONCACAF Champions League. He then scored his first goal for Atlanta United on 4 May 2021 against the Philadelphia Union in the Champions League, the match ending in a 1–1 draw.

In August 2026, Sosa joined the Brazilian club Vasco da Gama, until December 2029. On August 16, he made his debut off the bench in the 12th minute against Santos, following an injury to Jair.

== International career ==
Born and raised in Argentina, Sosa is of Croatian descent and holds dual citizenship. Whilst with River Plate, represented the Argentina U20 team; including in training sessions with the seniors. Sosa was selected for the 2019 South American U-20 Championship. He also made the squad for the 2019 FIFA U-20 World Cup in Poland, where he made four appearances in the tournament.

== Career statistics ==
As of match played 11 March 2023

Appearances and goals by club, season and competition
Club	Season	League			Cup		Continental		Other		Total	
Club	Season	Division	Apps	Goals	Apps	Goals	Apps	Goals	Apps	Goals	Apps	Goals
River Plate	2018–19	Primera División	4	0	0	0	1 (Note: Appearance(s) in the Copa Libertadores)	0	0	0	5	0
River Plate	2019–20	Primera División	2	0	0	0	0	0	0	0	2	0
River Plate	2020–21	Copa de la Liga Profesional	8	0	0	0	6	0	0	0	14	0
River Plate	Total		14	0	0	0	6	0	0	0	20	0
Atlanta United	2021	Major League Soccer	25	0	0	0	4 (Note: Appearance(s) in the CONCACAF Champions League)	1	1 (Note: Appearance(s) in the MLS Cup Playoffs)	0	30	1
Atlanta United	2022	Major League Soccer	21	1	1	0	0	0	0	0	22	1
Atlanta United	2023	Major League Soccer	1	0	0	0	0	0	0	0	1	0
Atlanta United	Total		47	1	1	0	4	1	1	0	53	2
Career total			61	1	1	0	10	1	1	0	73	2

== Honours ==
River Plate

- Copa Libertadores: 2018

Racing

- Copa Sudamericana: 2024

Individual

- Copa Sudamericana Team of the Tournament: 2024
- Copa Libertadores Team of the Tournament: 2025
- South American Team of the Year: 2025
