= Erik López =

Paraguayan football player (born 2001)

Personal information
- Full name: Erik Nicolás López Samaniego
- Date of birth: 27 November 2001 (age 24)
- Place of birth: Asunción, Paraguay
- Height: 5 ft 9 in (1.76 m)
- Position: Forward

Team information
- Current team: Olimpia
- Number: 32

Youth career
- 2013–2019: Olimpia

Senior career*
Years	Team	Apps	(Gls)
2019–2020	Olimpia	16	(4)
2020	→ Atlanta United 2 (loan)	0	(0)
2020–2023	Atlanta United	19	(1)
2021–2023	Atlanta United 2	6	(2)
2022	→ Banfield (loan)	15	(0)
2024–	Olimpia	37	(2)

International career
2020	Paraguay U23	2	(0)
- * Club domestic league appearances and goals as of 13 August 2025

Erik Nicolás López Samaniego (born 27 November 2001) is a Paraguayan professional footballer who plays as a forward for CSD Municipal in the Liga Nacional de Fútbol de Guatemala.

== Club career ==
=== Olimpia ===
Born in Asunción, López began his career in youth system of Olimpia. On 25 August 2019, López made his professional debut for Olimpia in the Primera División against Deportivo Santaní. He started and also scored his first goal in the 28th minute as Olimpia won 4–0. In the following two matches, López scored another two goals, one each against Deportivo Capiatá and San Lorenzo.

López finished his first professional season at Olimpia with 4 goals in 15 matches.

=== Atlanta United ===
On 18 July 2020, López signed with Major League Soccer club Atlanta United on a contract starting prior to the 2021 season. For the 2020 season, López would join Atlanta United 2, the reserve side of Atlanta United, in the USL Championship.

==== Loan to Banfield ====
On 22 February 2022, López was loaned to Banfield for the 2022 season.

==== Mutual termination ====
On August 4, 2023, Atlanta United and López agreed to a mutual termination of his contract.

== International career ==
In 2020, López was called-in as part of the Paraguay squad for the CONMEBOL Pre-Olympic Tournament. He made his debut for the Paraguay under-23s on 19 January 2020 against Uruguay, starting in a 1–0 defeat.

== Career statistics ==
As of match played 16 December 2020

Appearances and goals by club, season and competition
Club	Season	League			Cup		Continental		Total	
Club	Season	Division	Apps	Goals	Apps	Goals	Apps	Goals	Apps	Goals
Olimpia	2019	Primera División	15	4	0	0	—		15	4
Olimpia	2020	Primera División	1	0	0	0	0	0	1	0
Olimpia	Total		16	4	0	0	0	0	16	4
Atlanta United 2 (loan)	2020	USL Championship	0	0	—		—		0	0
Career total			16	4	0	0	0	0	16	4

== Honours ==
Olimpia

- Primera División: 2019 Torneo Clausura
