= List of Atlanta United FC records and statistics =

Atlanta United FC is an American professional soccer team based in Atlanta, Georgia that competes in Major League Soccer (MLS).

This is a list of franchise records for Atlanta United, which dates from their inaugural season in 2017 to present.

== Honors ==
- MLS Cup
  - Winners: 2018
- Campeones Cup
  - Winners: 2019
- Eastern Conference (playoffs)
  - Winners: 2018
- U.S. Open Cup
  - Winners: 2019

== Player records ==
=== Most appearances ===
#	Pos.	Name	Nation	Career	MLS	Playoffs	USOC	INTL	Total
1	Goalkeeper	Brad Guzan	United States	2017–2025	225	18	4	15	262
2	Defender	Brooks Lennon	United States	2020–2025	171	6	8	10	195
3	Forward	Josef Martínez	Venezuela	2017–2022	134	10	3	11	158
4	Defender	Miles Robinson	United States	2017–2023	123	6	9	12	150
5	Midfielder	Jeff Larentowicz	United States	2017–2020	113	8	3	8	132
6	Midfielder	Julian Gressel	United States	2017–2019	98	9	7	4	118
7	Defender	Leandro González Pírez	Argentina	2017–2019	95	9	7	4	115
8	Midfielder	**Miguel Almirón**	Paraguay	2017–2019, 2025–	97	6	2	2	107
8	Midfielder	Esequiel Barco	Argentina	2018–2023	81	9	5	12	107
10	Defender	Michael Parkhurst	United States	2017–2019	86	8	2	4	100

As of March 17, 2026

USOC = U.S. Open Cup; INTL = CONCACAF Champions League, Campeones Cup, Leagues Cup
Bolded players are currently on the Atlanta United FC roster.

=== Goals ===
#	Pos.	Name	Nation	Career	MLS	Playoffs	USOC	INTL	Total
1	Forward	Josef Martínez	Venezuela	2017–2022	98	5	2	6	111
2	Midfielder	**Miguel Almirón**	Paraguay	2017–2018, 2025–	27	1	0	0	28
3	Midfielder	Thiago Almada	Argentina	2022–2024	23	1	1	1	26
4	Forward	Giorgos Giakoumakis	Greece	2023–2024	22	2	0	0	24
5	Forward	Héctor Villalba	Paraguay	2017–2019	21	1	0	0	22
6	Midfielder	Julian Gressel	United States	2017–2019	15	2	1	2	20
7	Midfielder	Esequiel Barco	Argentina	2018–2023	17	0	1	1	19
8	Midfielder	**Saba Lobzhanidze**	Georgia	2023–	12	1	0	2	15
9	Midfielder	**Aleksei Miranchuk**	Russia	2024–	12	0	0	2	14
9	Midfielder	Marcelino Moreno	Argentina	2020–2023	13	0	1	0	14
9	Forward	Jamal Thiaré	Senegal	2023–2025	11	2	0	1	14

As of March 17, 2026

USOC = U.S. Open Cup; INTL = CONCACAF Champions League, Campeones Cup, Leagues Cup
Bolded players are currently on the Atlanta United FC roster.

=== Assists ===
#	Pos.	Name	Nation	Career	MLS	Playoffs	USOC	INTL	Total
1	Midfielder	Julian Gressel	United States	2017–2019	35	2	2	0	39
2	Defender	Brooks Lennon	United States	2020–2025	33	3	0	1	37
3	Midfielder	Thiago Almada	Argentina	2022–2024	31	0	0	0	31
3	Midfielder	**Miguel Almirón**	Paraguay	2017–2018; 2025–	29	2	0	0	31
5	Midfielder	Esequiel Barco	Argentina	2018–2023	17	2	2	3	24
5	Forward	Héctor Villalba	Paraguay	2017–2019	24	0	0	0	24
7	Forward	Josef Martínez	Venezuela	2017–2022	16	1	0	2	19
8	Midfielder	Pity Martínez	Argentina	2019–2020	11	2	1	3	17
9	Midfielder	Marcelino Moreno	Argentina	2020–2023	14	0	1	1	16
10	Forward	Yamil Asad	Argentina	2017	13	0	0	0	13

As of June 30, 2025

USOC = U.S. Open Cup; INTL = CONCACAF Champions League, Campeones Cup, Leagues Cup
Bolded players are currently on the Atlanta United FC roster.

=== Shutouts ===
#	Pos.	Name	Nation	Career	MLS	Playoffs	USOC	INTL	Total
1	Goalkeeper	Brad Guzan	United States	2017–2025	61	5	2	5	73
2	Goalkeeper	Alec Kann	United States	2017–2021	4	0	1	0	5
3	Goalkeeper	Rocco Ríos Novo	Argentina	2021–2022	2	0	0	2	4
4	Goalkeeper	Josh Cohen	United States	2024–2025	0	0	2	1	3
5	Goalkeeper	**Jayden Hibbert**	Canada	2025–	2	0	0	0	2
5	Goalkeeper	Raúl Gudiño	Mexico	2022	2	0	0	0	2
5	Goalkeeper	Bobby Shuttleworth	United States	2022	1	0	1	0	2
8	Goalkeeper	Quentin Westberg	United States	2023–2024	1	0	0	0	1

As of March 8, 2026

USOC = U.S. Open Cup; INTL = CONCACAF Champions League, Campeones Cup, Leagues Cup
Bolded players are currently on the Atlanta United FC roster.

=== Hat Tricks ===
Player	Nationality	Against	Result	Date	Competition	Ref.
Josef Martínez (6)	Venezuela	Minnesota United FC	6–1	March 11, 2017	Major League Soccer	
Josef Martínez (6)	Venezuela	New England Revolution	7–0	September 13, 2017	Major League Soccer	
Josef Martínez (6)	Venezuela	Orlando City SC	3–3	September 16, 2017	Major League Soccer	
Josef Martínez (6)	Venezuela	Vancouver Whitecaps FC	4–1	March 17, 2018	Major League Soccer	
Josef Martínez (6)	Venezuela	Philadelphia Union	3–1	June 2, 2018	Major League Soccer	
Josef Martínez (6)	Venezuela	D.C. United	3–1	July 21, 2018	Major League Soccer	
Miguel Almirón	Paraguay	Houston Dynamo	4–1	May 20, 2017	Major League Soccer	
Ronaldo Cisneros	Mexico	Chicago Fire FC	4–1	May 7, 2022	Major League Soccer	
Juanjo Purata	Mexico	Toronto FC	4–2	September 10, 2022	Major League Soccer	
Giorgos Giakoumakis	Greece	New England Revolution	4–1	March 9, 2024	Major League Soccer	

== Coaching records ==
As of March 8, 2026

Coach	From	To	Record (Note: Includes Major League Soccer, MLS Cup Playoffs, U.S. Open Cup, CONCACAF Champions League, Campeones Cup and MLS is Back Tournament)				
Coach	From	To	G	W	D	L	Win %
(Argentina) Gerardo Martino	September 27, 2016	December 10, 2018	78	42	17	19	53.85
(Netherlands) Frank de Boer	December 23, 2018	July 24, 2020	55	31	5	19	56.36
(Scotland) Stephen Glass (interim)	July 27, 2020	December 18, 2020	19	5	4	10	26.32
(Argentina) Gabriel Heinze	December 18, 2020	July 18, 2021	17	4	8	5	23.53
(United States) Rob Valentino (interim)	July 18, 2021	August 12, 2021	5	1	2	2	20.00
(Mexico) Gonzalo Pineda	August 12, 2021	June 3, 2024	108	37	31	40	34.26
(United States) Rob Valentino (interim)	June 3, 2024	December 19, 2024	24	7	9	8	29.17
(Norway) Ronny Delia	December 20, 2024	October 19, 2025	37	6	13	18	16.22
(Argentina) Gerardo Martino	November 6, 2025	Present	3	0	0	3	0.00
Total			346	133	89	124	38.44

=== Trophies ===
No.	Name	MLS	SS	USOC	CCL	CC	Total
1	(Netherlands) Frank de Boer	–	–	1	–	1	2
2	(Argentina) Gerardo Martino	1	–	–	–	–	1

== Transfer records ==
=== Highest transfer fees paid ===
#	Pos.	Player	From	Fee	Date
1	Forward	(Ivory Coast) Emmanuel Latte Lath	(England) Middlesbrough	$22 million	February 2025
2	Midfielder	(Argentina) Thiago Almada	(Argentina) Vélez Sarsfield	$16 million	January 2022
3	Midfielder	(Argentina) Pity Martínez	(Argentina) River Plate	$15.5 million	January 2019
4	Midfielder	(Argentina) Esequiel Barco	(Argentina) Independiente	$15 million	January 2018
5	Midfielder	(Russia) Aleksei Miranchuk	(Italy) Atalanta	$13 million	July 2024
6	Forward	(Brazil) Luiz Araújo	(France) Lille	$12 million	August 2021
7	Midfielder	(Paraguay) Miguel Almirón	(England) Newcastle United	$10 million	January 2025
8	Midfielder	(Paraguay) Miguel Almirón	(Argentina) Lanús	$8 million	December 2016
9	Midfielder	(Argentina) Marcelino Moreno	(Argentina) Lanús	$7 million	September 2020
10	Forward	(Greece) Giorgos Giakoumakis	(Scotland) Celtic	$5.2 million	February 2023

=== Highest transfer fees received ===
#	Pos.	Player	To	Fee	Date
1	Midfielder	(Argentina) Thiago Almada	(Brazil) Botafogo	$30 million	July 2024
2	Midfielder	(Paraguay) Miguel Almirón	(England) Newcastle United	$26 million	January 2019
3	Midfielder	(Argentina) Pity Martínez	(Saudi Arabia) Al-Nassr	$18 million	September 2020
4	Midfielder	(United States) Caleb Wiley	(England) Chelsea	$11 million	July 2024
5	Midfielder	(Brazil) Luiz Araújo	(Brazil) Flamengo	$10 million	July 2023
5	Midfielder	(Greece) Giorgos Giakoumakis	(Mexico) Cruz Azul	$10 million	June 2024
7	Midfielder	(Argentina) Esequiel Barco	(Argentina) River Plate	$6.4 million	January 2023
8	Midfielder	(Paraguay) Héctor Villalba	(Paraguay) Libertad	$4.4 million	January 2020
9	Midfielder	(Argentina) Santiago Sosa	(Argentina) Racing Club	$4 million	January 2025
10	Defender	(Argentina) Alan Franco	(Brazil) São Paulo	$2.3 million	January 2023

== International results ==
=== By competition ===
As of August 6, 2025 (Includes CONCACAF Champions League, Campeones Cup, and Leagues Cup)

Competition	Pld	W	D	L	GF	GA	GD	W%
CONCACAF Champions League	12	6	1	5	14	14	0	50.00
Campeones Cup	1	1	0	0	3	2	+1	100.00
Leagues Cup	7	1	3	3	11	15	-4	0.00
Total	20	8	4	8	28	31	-3	40.00

=== By club ===
As of August 6, 2025 (Includes CONCACAF Champions League, Campeones Cup, and Leagues Cup)

Club	Pld	W	D	L	GF	GA	GD
(Costa Rica) Alajuelense	2	2	0	0	2	0	+2
(Mexico) América	3	2	0	1	4	5	–1
(Mexico) Atlas	1	1	0	0	4	1	+3
(Mexico) Cruz Azul	1	0	1	0	1	1	+0
(United States) D.C. United	1	0	1	0	3	3	+0
(Costa Rica) Herediano	2	1	0	1	5	3	+2
(United States) Inter Miami	1	0	0	1	0	4	–4
(Mexico) Monterrey	2	1	0	1	1	3	–2
(Honduras) Motagua	2	1	1	0	4	1	+3
(Mexico) Necaxa	1	0	0	1	1	3	–2
(United States) Philadelphia Union	2	0	1	1	1	4	–3
(Mexico) Santos Laguna	1	0	1	0	0	0	+0
(Mexico) UNAM	1	0	0	1	2	3	–1

=== By country ===
As of August 6, 2025 (Includes CONCACAF Champions League, Campeones Cup, and Leagues Cup)

Country	Pld	W	D	L	GF	GA	GD
Costa Rica	4	3	0	1	7	3	+4
Honduras	2	1	1	0	4	1	+3
Mexico	10	4	2	4	13	16	–3
United States	4	0	2	2	4	11	–7

=== By season ===
Competition	Season	Round	Opposition	Home	Away	Aggregate
CONCACAF Champions League	2019	Round of 16	(Costa Rica) Herediano	4–0	1–3	5–3
CONCACAF Champions League	2019	Quarterfinals	(Mexico) Monterrey	1–0	0–3	1–3
CONCACAF Champions League	2020	Round of 16	(Honduras) Motagua	3–0	1–1	4–1
CONCACAF Champions League	2020	Quarterfinals	(Mexico) América	1–0	0–3	1–3
CONCACAF Champions League	2021	Round of 16	(Costa Rica) Alajuelense	1–0	1–0	2–0
CONCACAF Champions League	2021	Quarterfinals	(United States) Philadelphia Union	0–3	1–1	1–4
Campeones Cup	2019	Final	(Mexico) América	3–2		
Leagues Cup	2023	Group Stage	(United States) Inter Miami	0–4		
Leagues Cup	2023	Group Stage	(Mexico) Cruz Azul	1–1 (4–5p)		
Leagues Cup	2024	Group Stage	(United States) D.C. United	3–3 (5–6p)		
Leagues Cup	2024	Group Stage	(Mexico) Santos Laguna	0–0 (3–5p)		
Leagues Cup	2025	League Stage	(Mexico) Necaxa	1–3		
Leagues Cup	2025	League Stage	(Mexico) UNAM	2–3		
Leagues Cup	2025	League Stage	(Mexico) Atlas	4–1		

== Individual honors ==
=== MLS MVP ===
Year	Player
2018	(Venezuela) Josef Martínez

=== MLS Best XI ===
Year	Player
2017	(Paraguay) Miguel Almirón (Venezuela) Josef Martínez
2018	(Paraguay) Miguel Almirón (2) (Venezuela) Josef Martínez (2)
2019	(Venezuela) Josef Martínez (3) (United States) Miles Robinson
2021	(United States) Miles Robinson (2)
2023	(Argentina) Thiago Almada (Greece) Giorgos Giakoumakis

=== Coach of the Year ===
Year	Player
2018	(Argentina) Gerardo Martino

=== Golden Boot ===
Year	Player
2018	(Venezuela) Josef Martínez

=== Newcomer of the Year ===
Year	Player
2017	(Paraguay) Miguel Almirón
2022	(Argentina) Thiago Almada
2023	(Greece) Giorgos Giakoumakis

=== Young Player of the Year Award ===
Year	Player
2017	(Germany) Julian Gressel
2023	(Argentina) Thiago Almada

=== MLS Cup MVP ===
Year	Player
2018	(Venezuela) Josef Martínez

=== All-Star Game MVP ===
Year	Player
2018	(Venezuela) Josef Martínez

=== Goal of the Year ===
Year	Player
2017	(Paraguay) Héctor Villalba
2019	(Venezuela) Josef Martínez
2022	(Venezuela) Josef Martínez

=== Save of the Year ===
Year	Player
2017	(United States) Brad Guzan
