= 2018 Atlanta United FC season =

Atlanta United FC
2018 season
- Owner: Arthur Blank
- President: Darren Eales
- Head coach: Gerardo Martino
- Stadium: Mercedes-Benz Stadium; Atlanta, Georgia
- MLS: Conference: 2nd Overall: 2nd
- MLS Cup playoffs: Champions
- U.S. Open Cup: Round of 16
- Top goalscorer: League: Josef Martínez (31); All: Josef Martínez (35)
- Highest home attendance: League/All: 73,019 (December 8 vs. Portland Timbers)
- Lowest home attendance: League: 44,696 (May 10 vs. Sporting Kansas City); All: 9,742 (June 6 vs. Charleston Battery)
- Average home league attendance: 53,002 (league - regular season); 55,730 (league - inc. playoffs); 52,970 (all)
- Biggest win: 5 goals: ATL 5–0 LAFC (April 7)
- Biggest defeat: 4 goals: HOU 4–0 ATL (March 3)
Home colors	Away colors

The 2018 Atlanta United FC season was the second season of Atlanta United FC's existence, and the tenth year that a professional soccer club from Atlanta, Georgia competed in the top division of American soccer. Atlanta played their home matches at Mercedes-Benz Stadium and were coached by Gerardo "Tata" Martino. Outside of MLS, the team participated in the 2018 U.S. Open Cup and the 2018 MLS Cup Playoffs, as well as various preseason competitions.

On November 17, 2017, Atlanta United announced the launch of a reserve team, Atlanta United 2, to play in what is currently named the USL Championship at the start of the 2018 season.

With a win over Chicago Fire on October 21, Atlanta qualified for the 2019 CONCACAF Champions League by having the best aggregate record across the 2017 and 2018 MLS seasons. The club later qualified for the competition by winning MLS Cup 2018, so their previously held spot was allocated to the team with the second best aggregate record, New York Red Bulls.

== Club ==
Squad no.	Name	Nationality	Position(s)	Date of birth (age)	Previous club	Apps	Goals
Goalkeepers
1	Brad Guzan (3rd Captain)	(United States)	GK	September 9, 1984 (age 41)	(England) Middlesbrough	53	0
25	Alec Kann	(United States)	GK	August 8, 1990 (age 35)	(United States) Sporting Kansas City	23	0
27	Mitch Hildebrandt	(United States)	GK	November 12, 1988 (age 37)	(United States) FC Cincinnati	0	0
33	Paul Christensen (Note: Christensen was signed to Atlanta United 2, but was signed to the first team under Short-Term Agreements twice during the 2018 season due to injury and suspension.)	(United States)	GK	April 15, 1996 (age 29)	(United States) University of Portland	1	0
Defenders
2	Franco Escobar	(Argentina)	RB	February 21, 1995 (age 31)	(Argentina) Newell's Old Boys	28	3
3	Michael Parkhurst (Captain)	(United States)	CB	January 24, 1984 (age 42)	(United States) Columbus Crew	72	0
4	Greg Garza	(United States)	LB	August 16, 1991 (age 34)	(Mexico) Tijuana	42	3
5	Leandro González Pírez	(Argentina)	CB	February 26, 1992 (age 34)	(Argentina) Estudiantes	73	2
12	Miles Robinson (GA)	(United States)	CB	March 14, 1997 (age 29)	(United States) Syracuse University	15	0
13	José Hernández (Note: Hernández was on the club's roster until July 15, when he was loaned to Atlanta United 2. He was recalled on August 19.)	(Venezuela)	LB	June 26, 1997 (age 28)	(Venezuela) Caracas	1	0
14	Sal Zizzo	(United States)	RB	April 3, 1987 (age 38)	(United States) New York Red Bulls	8	0
16	Chris McCann	(Republic of Ireland)	LB	July 21, 1987 (age 38)	(England) Wigan Athletic	50	1
21	George Bello (HGP)	(United States)	LB	January 22, 2002 (age 24)	(United States) Atlanta United Academy	3	1
22	Mikey Ambrose	(United States)	LB	October 5, 1993 (age 32)	(United States) Orlando City SC	20	0
Midfielders
6	Darlington Nagbe	(United States)	AM	July 19, 1990 (age 35)	(United States) Portland Timbers	28	0
8	Ezequiel Barco (DP)	(Argentina)	AM	March 23, 1999 (age 26)	(Argentina) Independiente	33	5
10	Miguel Almirón (DP)	(Paraguay)	LW	February 10, 1994 (age 32)	(Argentina) Lanús	70	22
11	Eric Remedi	(Argentina)	DM	June 4, 1995 (age 30)	(Argentina) Banfield	18	1
15	Héctor Villalba	(Paraguay) (Note: On September 4, 2018 Héctor Villalba made a one time switch to represent Paraguay, which he qualifies to represent through his father.)	RW	July 26, 1994 (age 31)	(Argentina) San Lorenzo	69	21
18	Jeff Larentowicz (Vice Captain)	(United States)	DM	August 5, 1983 (age 42)	(United States) LA Galaxy	73	2
20	Chris Goslin (HGP)	(United States)	AM	May 12, 2000 (age 25)	(United States) Atlanta United Academy	1	0
23	Lagos Kunga (HGP)	(United States)	LW	October 20, 1998 (age 27)	(United States) Atlanta United Academy	1	0
24	Julian Gressel	(Germany)	AM	December 16, 1993 (age 32)	(United States) Providence College	75	10
28	Andrew Wheeler-Omiunu	(United States)	AM	November 30, 1994 (age 31)	(United States) Harvard University	4	0
30	Andrew Carleton (HGP)	(United States)	RW	June 22, 2000 (age 25)	(United States) Atlanta United Academy	11	1
32	Kevin Kratz	(Germany)	CM	January 21, 1987 (age 39)	(United States) Philadelphia Union	52	4
Forwards
7	Josef Martínez (DP)	(Venezuela)	ST	May 19, 1993 (age 32)	(Italy) Torino	61	55
9	Romario Williams	(Jamaica)	CF	August 15, 1994 (age 31)	(Canada) Montreal Impact	19	2
19	Brandon Vazquez	(United States)	CF	October 14, 1998 (age 27)	(Mexico) Tijuana	25	3
Players out on loan
26	Jon Gallagher (Note: Gallagher was on the club's roster until August 19, when he was loaned to Atlanta United 2.)	(Republic of Ireland)	RW	February 23, 1996 (age 30)	(United States) University of Notre Dame	0	0
29	Oliver Shannon	(England)	MF	September 12, 1995 (age 30)	(United States) Clemson University	0	0
31	Patrick Okonkwo (HGP)	(Nigeria)	CF	April 23, 1998 (age 27)	(United States) Atlanta United Academy	0	0
—	Gordon Wild (GA)	(Germany)	FW	October 16, 1995 (age 30)	(United States) University of Maryland	0	0

=== International roster slots ===
Atlanta had seven International Roster Slots at the end of the 2018 season. Josef Martínez occupied an International Roster Slot until July 9, when he received a green card, making him a domestic player for MLS roster purposes. Jon Gallagher occupied an International Roster Slot until August 19, when he was sent on loan to Atlanta United 2 and José Hernández was recalled from the second team to replace Gallagher.

Atlanta United International Roster Slots
Slot	Player	Country
1	Franco Escobar	Argentina
2	Leandro González Pírez	Argentina
3	Ezequiel Barco	Argentina
4	Miguel Almirón	Paraguay
5	Julian Gressel	Germany
6	Eric Remedi	Argentina
7	José Hernández	Venezuela

== Results ==
=== Non-competitive ===
Win Draw Loss

==== Friendlies ====
February 10, 2018 Friendly	Nashville SC	1–3	Atlanta United	Nashville, Tennessee
4:00 p.m. EST	Mensah 65'	Report	Martínez 58'; Vazquez 75'; Williams 78'	Stadium: First Tennessee Park; Attendance: 9,059

==== Carolina Challenge Cup ====
February 17, 2018 1	Atlanta United	1–3	Columbus Crew	Charleston, South Carolina
5:00 p.m. EST	Almirón 90'	Report	Santos 13'; C. Martínez 34'; J. Martínez 71' (o.g.)	Stadium: MUSC Health Stadium

February 21, 2018 2	Atlanta United	1–1	Minnesota United FC	Charleston, South Carolina
7:30 PM EST	Barco 85'		Molino 52' (pen.)	Stadium: MUSC Health Stadium

February 24, 2018 3	Charleston Battery	0–0	Atlanta United	Charleston, South Carolina
7:30 p.m. EST		Report		Stadium: MUSC Health Stadium

=== Competitive ===
==== Major League Soccer ====
===== League tables =====
====== Eastern Conference ======
Pos	Team	Pld	W	L	T	GF	GA	GD	Pts	Qualification
1	New York Red Bulls	34	22	7	5	62	33	+29	71	MLS Cup Conference Semifinals
2	Atlanta United FC	34	21	7	6	70	44	+26	69	MLS Cup Conference Semifinals
3	New York City FC	34	16	10	8	59	45	+14	56	MLS Cup Knockout Round
4	D.C. United	34	14	11	9	60	50	+10	51	MLS Cup Knockout Round
5	Columbus Crew	34	14	11	9	43	45	−2	51	MLS Cup Knockout Round
6	Philadelphia Union	34	15	14	5	49	50	−1	50	MLS Cup Knockout Round

Source: MLS

====== Overall ======
Pos	Team	Pld	W	L	T	GF	GA	GD	Pts	Qualification
1	New York Red Bulls (S)	34	22	7	5	62	33	+29	71	CONCACAF Champions League
2	Atlanta United FC (C)	34	21	7	6	70	44	+26	69	CONCACAF Champions League
3	Sporting Kansas City	34	18	8	8	65	40	+25	62	CONCACAF Champions League
4	Seattle Sounders FC	34	18	11	5	52	37	+15	59	

Source: MLS
Rules for classification: 1) points; 2) total wins; 3) total goal differential; 4) total goals scored; 5) disciplinary points; 6) away goals scored; 7) away goal differential; 8) coin toss or drawing of lots
(C) MLS Cup Champion; (S) Supporters' Shield

===== Results summary =====
Overall								Home						Away					
Pld	W	D	L	GF	GA	GD	Pts	W	D	L	GF	GA	GD	W	D	L	GF	GA	GD
34	21	6	7	70	44	+26	69	11	4	2	42	19	+23	10	2	5	28	25	+3

Source: Match reports

===== Results by round =====
Round	1	2	3	4	5	6	7	8	9	10	11	12	13	14	15	16	17	18	19	20	21	22	23	24	25	26	27	28	29	30	31	32	33	34
Stadium	A	H	H	A	H	H	A	H	A	H	A	H	A	H	A	A	H	H	A	A	H	H	A	H	H	A	A	A	A	H	A	H	H	A
Result	L	W	W	W	W	D	W	W	W	L	W	L	D	W	D	W	D	W	L	W	D	W	W	D	W	W	L	W	W	W	L	W	W	L
Position (conf.)	11	6	3	3	2	2	2	2	1	1	1	1	1	1	1	1	1	1	1	1	1	1	1	1	1	1	1	2	1	1	1	1	1	2

Source: Match reports
A = Away; H = Home; W = Win; D = Draw; L = Loss

===== Matches =====
Win Draw Loss

March 3, 2018 1	Houston Dynamo	4–0	Atlanta United	Houston, Texas
3:30 p.m. EST	Wenger 5'; Senderos 23'; Manotas 27'; Cerén 45+5'; Seitz (yellow card) 61'	Report	González Pírez (yellow card) 32'; McCann (yellow card) 34'; Gressel (yellow card) 45+7'	Stadium: BBVA Compass Stadium; Attendance: 20,377; Referee: Allen Chapman

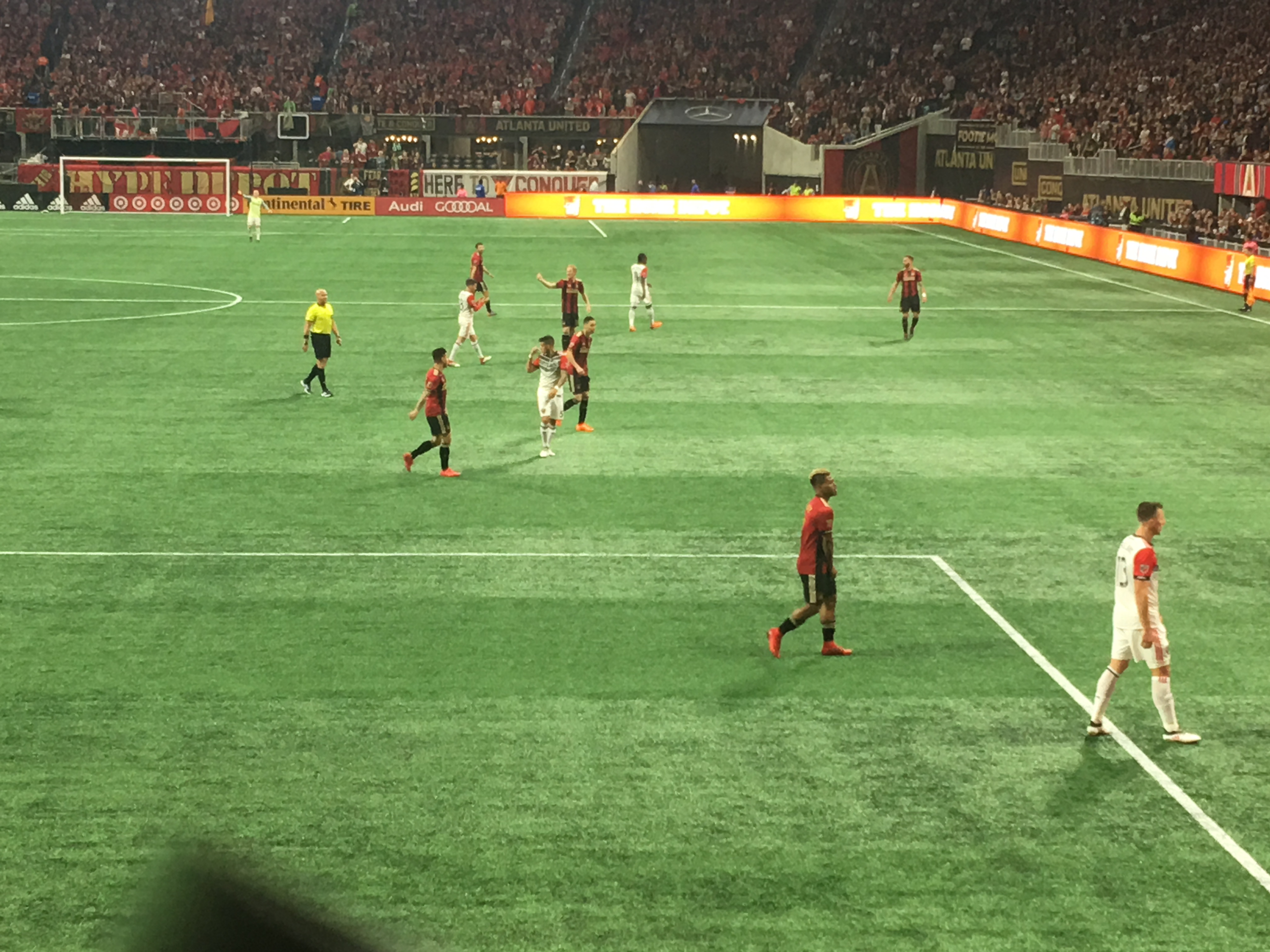
March 11, 2018 2	Atlanta United	3–1	D.C. United	Atlanta, Georgia
3:00 p.m. EDT	Martínez 24'; Garza (yellow card) 50'; Escobar (yellow card) 63'; Almirón 73'; Villalba 75'	Report	Fisher (yellow card) 36'; Mattocks 86'	Stadium: Mercedes-Benz Stadium; Attendance: 72,035; Referee: Robert Sibiga
Note: 2018-03-11 - Atlanta United vs DC United

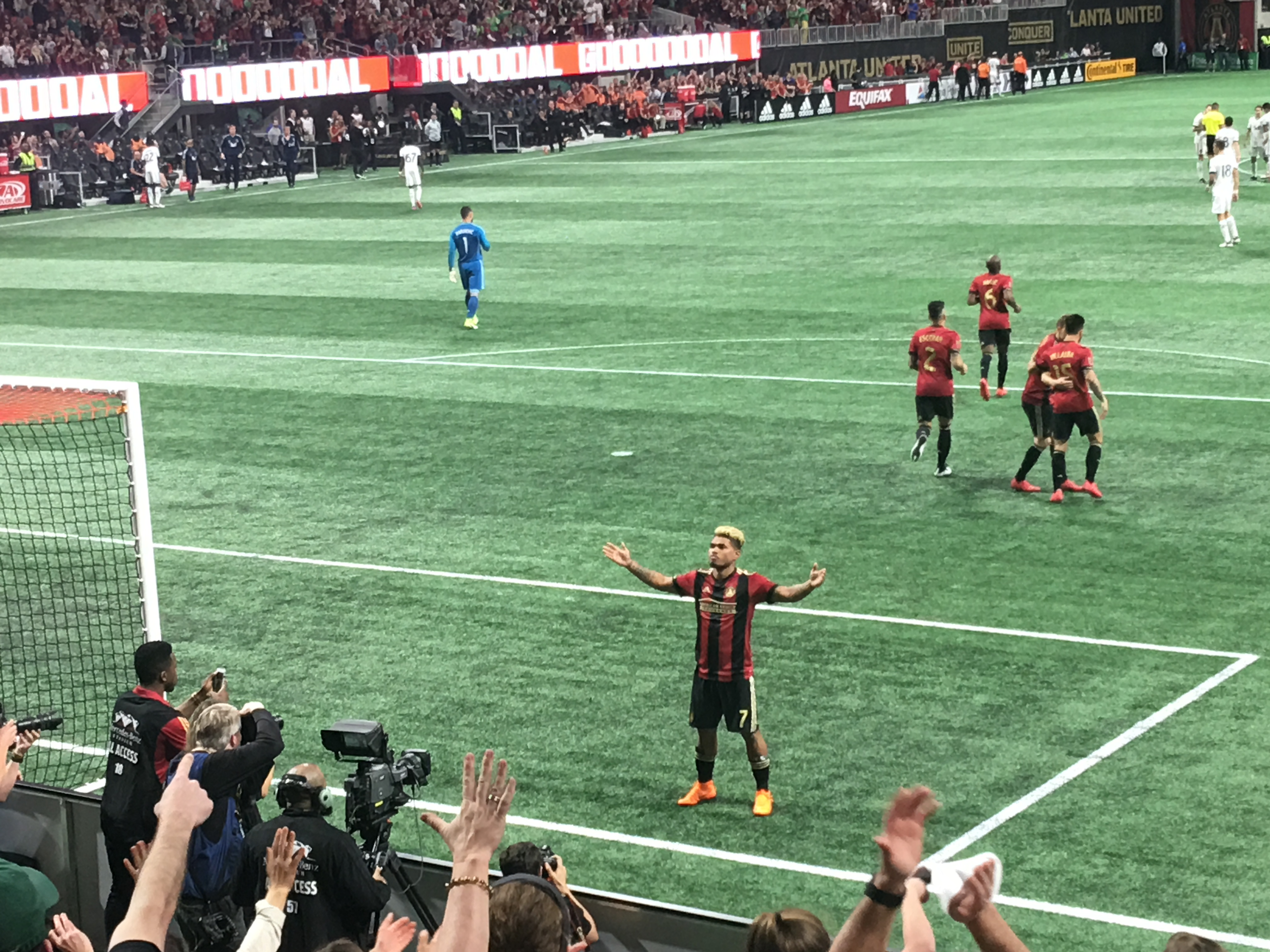
March 17, 2018 3	Atlanta United	4–1	Vancouver Whitecaps FC	Atlanta, Georgia
7:30 p.m. EDT	Martínez 15' (pen.), 60', 88'; Larentowicz (yellow card) 45+3'; Maund 58' (o.g.)	Report	Juárez (yellow card) 13'; Waston (red card) 13'; Aja (yellow card) 60'; Reyna (yellow card) 72'; Hurtado 85'	Stadium: Mercedes-Benz Stadium; Attendance: 45,003; Referee: Ismail Elfath
Note: 2018-03-17 - Atlanta United vs Vancouver Whitecaps

March 31, 2018 4	Minnesota United FC	0–1	Atlanta United	Minneapolis, Minnesota
8:00 p.m. EDT	Calvo (yellow card) 90+3'	Report	González Pírez (yellow card) 1' (yellow-red card) 38'; Calvo 3' (o.g.); Guzan (yellow card) 90+1'	Stadium: TCF Bank Stadium; Attendance: 18,057; Referee: Chris Penso

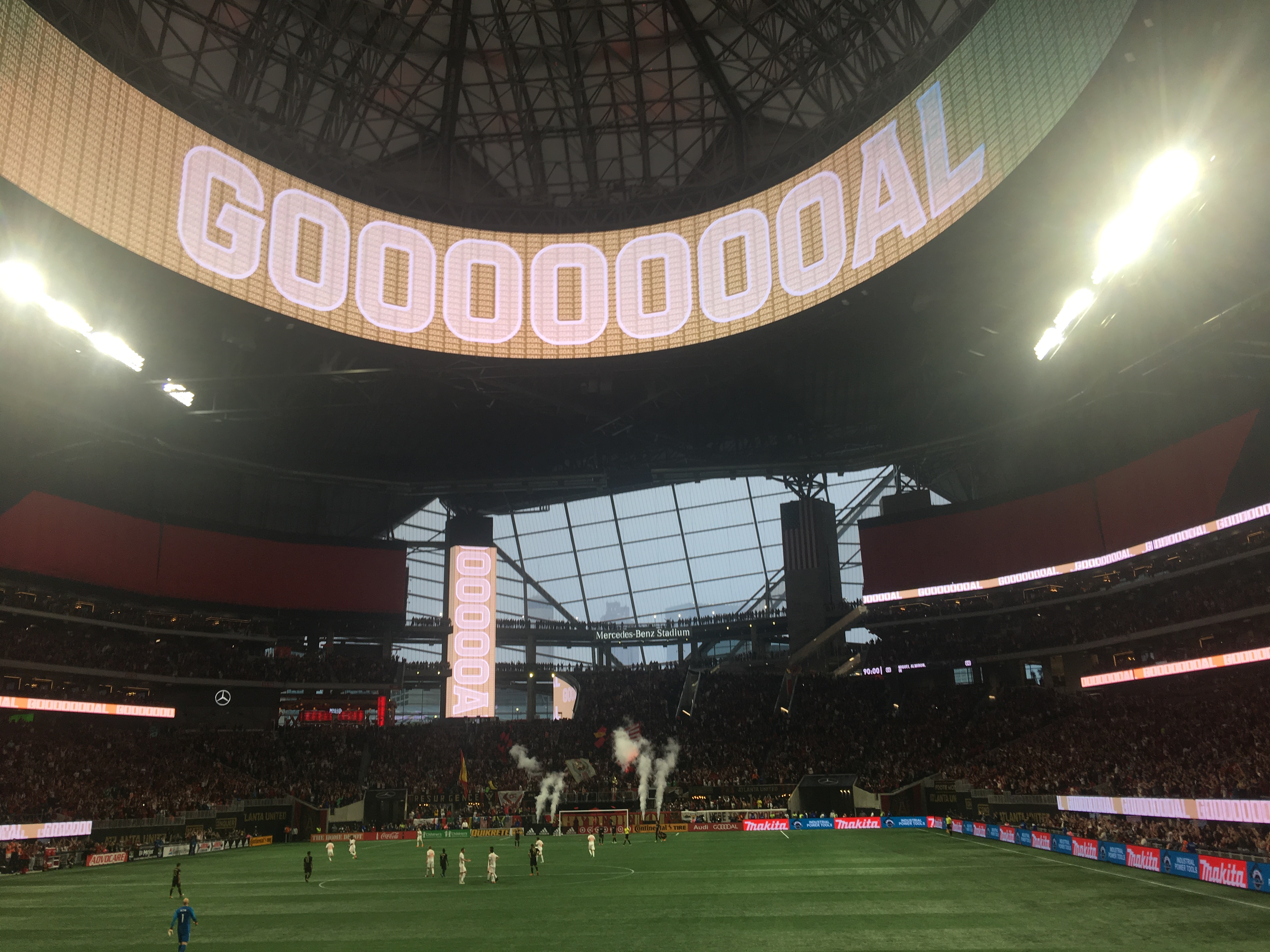
April 7, 2018 5	Atlanta United	5–0	Los Angeles FC	Atlanta, Georgia
5:00 p.m. EDT	McCann (yellow card) 1'; Gressel 17'; Almirón (yellow card) 48', (goal) 88' (pen.), 90+2' (pen.); Martínez 67'; Williams 90+7', (yellow card) 90+8'	Report	Moutinho (yellow card) 90' (yellow-red card) 90+2'	Stadium: Mercedes-Benz Stadium; Attendance: 45,207; Referee: Ted Unkel
Note: 2018-04-07 - Atlanta United vs LAFC

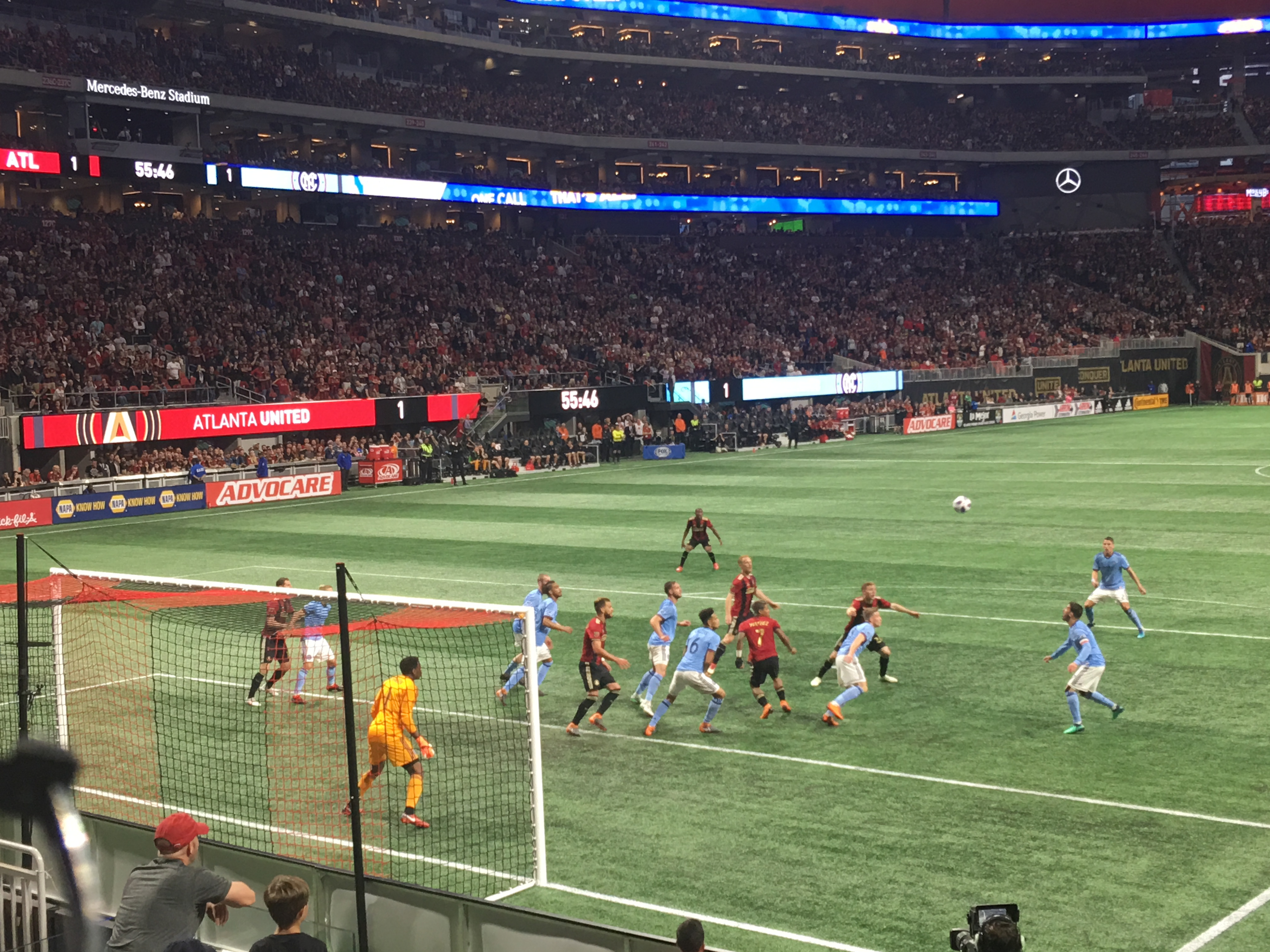
April 15, 2018 6	Atlanta United	2–2	New York City FC	Atlanta, Georgia
6:00 p.m. EDT	Garza 29'; McCann 56', (yellow card) 70'; Larentowicz (yellow card) 90+3'	Report	Ring (yellow card) 32', (goal) 73'; Villa 38' (pen.), (yellow card) 89'; Moralez (yellow card) 55'; Herrera (yellow card) 80'	Stadium: Mercedes-Benz Stadium; Attendance: 45,001; Referee: Allen Chapman
Note: 2018-04-15 - Atlanta United vs NYFC

April 21, 2018 7	LA Galaxy	0–2	Atlanta United	Carson, California
10:30 p.m. EDT	Skjelvik (yellow card) 24'; Kitchen (yellow card) 29'; Carrasco (yellow card) 85'	Report	Martínez 22'; Parkhurst (yellow card) 75'; Almirón (yellow card) 77', (goal) 90+4' (pen.); Williams (yellow card) 90+3'	Stadium: StubHub Center; Attendance: 25,846; Referee: Baldomero Toledo

April 28, 2018 8	Atlanta United	4–1	Montreal Impact	Atlanta, Georgia
1:00 p.m. EDT	González Pírez (yellow card) 56'; Garza (yellow card) 59'; Almirón 70' (pen.), 84', (yellow card) 81'; Kratz 78', 90+4'	Report	Taïder 13', (yellow card) 83'; Piette (yellow card) 35'; Bush (yellow card) 60'; Duvall (yellow card) 68'	Stadium: Mercedes-Benz Stadium; Attendance: 45,039; Referee: Chico Grajeda

May 5, 2018 9	Chicago Fire	1–2	Atlanta United	Bridgeview, Illinois
8:30 p.m. EDT	Kappelhof (yellow card) 24'; Ellis 61'; Lillard (yellow card) 80'	Report	Barco 53', (yellow card) 73'; Martínez 57'; González Pírez (yellow card) 65'; Villalba (yellow card) 90+5'	Stadium: Toyota Park; Attendance: 15,024; Referee: Drew Fischer

May 9, 2018 10	Atlanta United	0–2	Sporting Kansas City	Atlanta, Georgia
7:30 p.m. EDT	Larentowicz (yellow card) 31'; Guzan (red card) 34'	Report	Sallói 67'; Gerso 87'; Besler (yellow card) 89'	Stadium: Mercedes-Benz Stadium; Attendance: 44,696; Referee: Mark Geiger

May 13, 2018 11	Orlando City SC	1–2	Atlanta United	Orlando, Florida
6:00 p.m. EDT	Higuita (yellow card) 20'; Bendik (yellow card) 32'; Meram 57'; Yotún (yellow card) 84'; Rosell (yellow card) 88'; Johnson (yellow card) 90+4'	Report	Martínez 10' (pen.); Barco 31'; Villalba (yellow card) 84'	Stadium: Orlando City Stadium; Attendance: 24,232; Referee: Alan Kelly

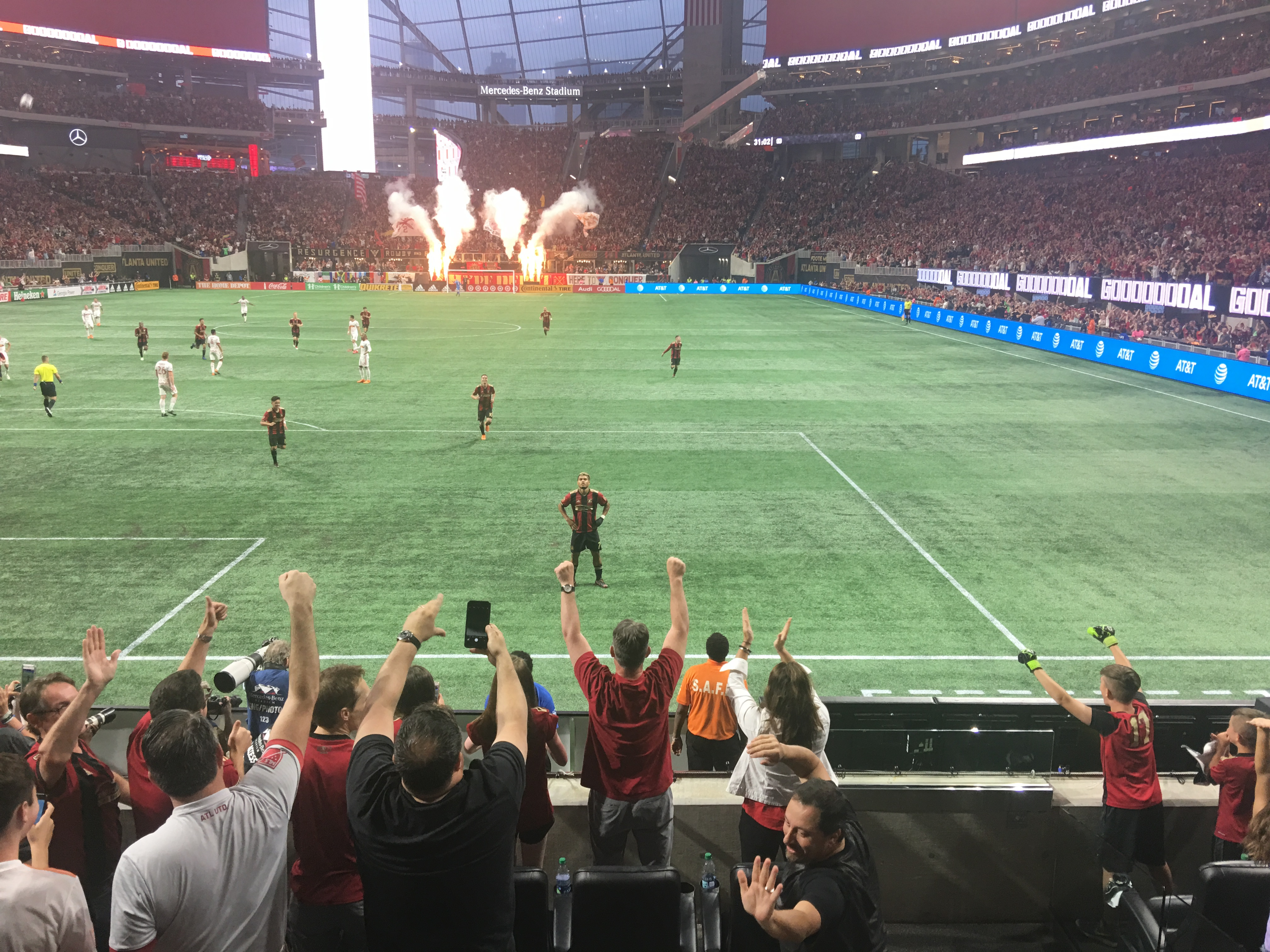
May 20, 2018 12	Atlanta United	1–3	New York Red Bulls	Atlanta, Georgia
7:00 p.m. EDT	Barco 26'; Almirón (yellow card) 42'; Larentowicz (yellow card) 49'; González Pírez (yellow card) 65'; Garza (red card) 71'	Report	Valot (yellow card) 29'; Royer 42' (pen.); Wright-Phillips 51', 55'; Parker (yellow card) 57'; Lade (yellow card) 90+5'	Stadium: Mercedes-Benz Stadium; Attendance: 45,089; Referee: Chris Penso
Note: 2018-05-20 - Atlanta United vs NY Red Bulls

May 30, 2018 13	New England Revolution	1–1	Atlanta United	Foxborough, Massachusetts
7:30 p.m. EDT	Zahibo (yellow card) 53'; Anibaba (yellow card) 73'; Németh (yellow card) 81'; Bunbury 88' (pen.)	Report	Martínez 23'; Gressel (yellow card) 36'; Guzan (yellow card) 88'; Williams (yellow card) 89'	Stadium: Gillette Stadium; Attendance: 10,547; Referee: Silviu Petrescu

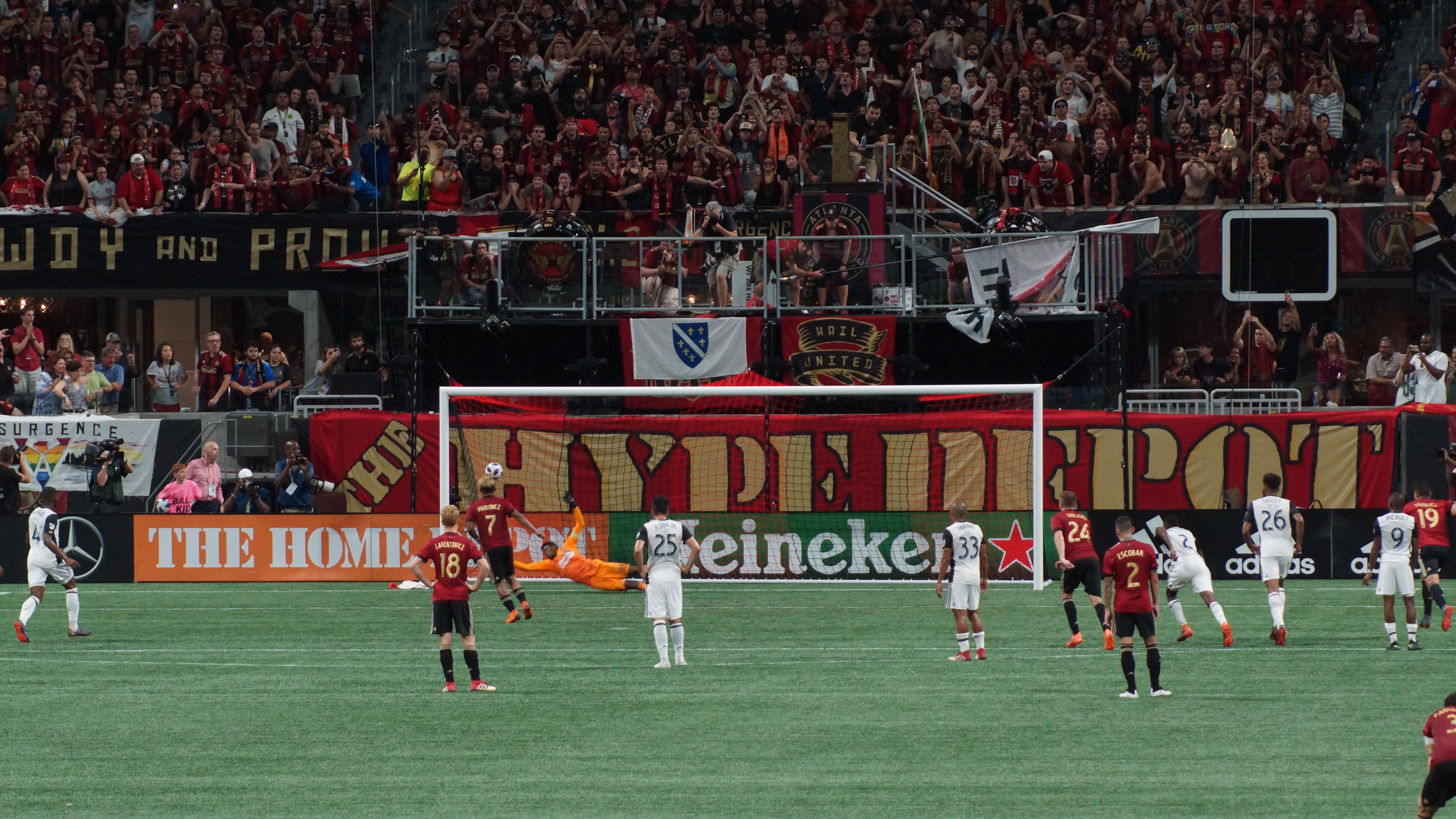
June 2, 2018 14	Atlanta United	3–1	Philadelphia Union	Atlanta, Georgia
7:00 p.m. EDT	Martínez 21' (pen.), 49', 83' (pen.)	Report	Bedoya (yellow card) 11' (yellow-red card) 19'; Medunjanin (yellow card) 19' (yellow-red card) 19'; Picault (yellow card) 23', (goal) 52'	Stadium: Mercedes-Benz Stadium; Attendance: 45,140; Referee: Sorin Stoica
Note: 2018-06-02 - Atlanta United vs Philadelphia Union - Martinez scoring

June 9, 2018 15	New York City FC	1–1	Atlanta United	New York, New York
12:30 p.m. EDT	Sweat (yellow card) 35'; Berget (yellow card) 58'; Callens 77'	Report	Martínez 48'; González Pírez (yellow card) 64'; Williams (yellow card) 73'	Stadium: Yankee Stadium; Attendance: 25,628; Referee: Robert Sibiga

June 13, 2018 16	Columbus Crew	0–2	Atlanta United	Columbus, Ohio
7:30 p.m. EDT	Trapp (yellow card) 81'	Report	Parkhurst (yellow card) 8'; Ambrose (yellow card) 27'; Martínez 30'; Escobar (yellow card) 72'; Villalba 82'	Stadium: Mapfre Stadium; Attendance: 10,132; Referee: Ted Unkel

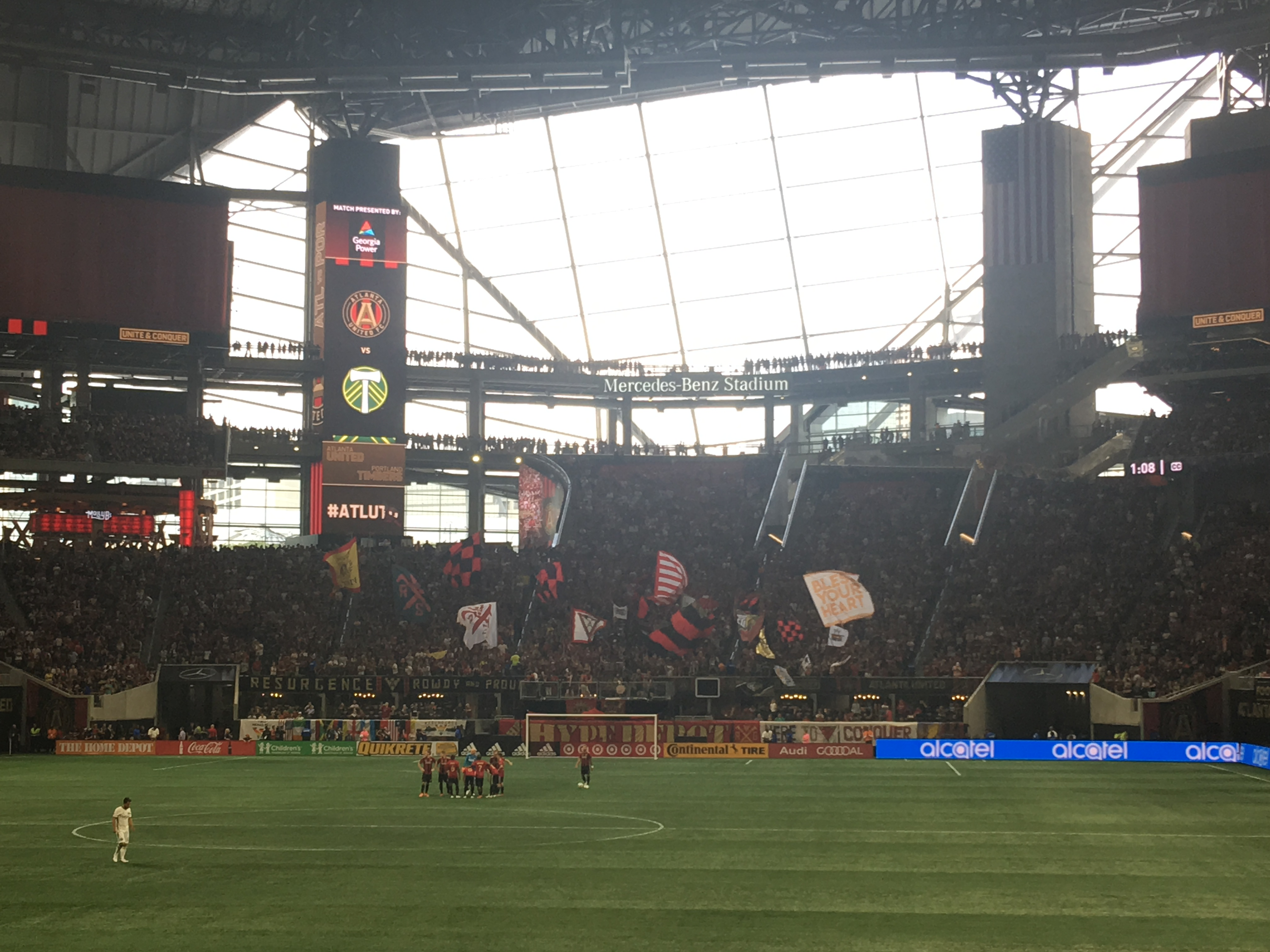
June 24, 2018 17	Atlanta United	1–1	Portland Timbers	Atlanta, Georgia
4:30 p.m. EDT	Escobar (yellow card) 32'; Gressel 56'	Report	Chará (yellow card) 24'; Mabiala 32', (yellow card) 44'	Stadium: Mercedes-Benz Stadium; Attendance: 45,116; Referee: Jose Carlos Rivero
Note: 2018-06-24 - Atlanta United vs Portland Timbers

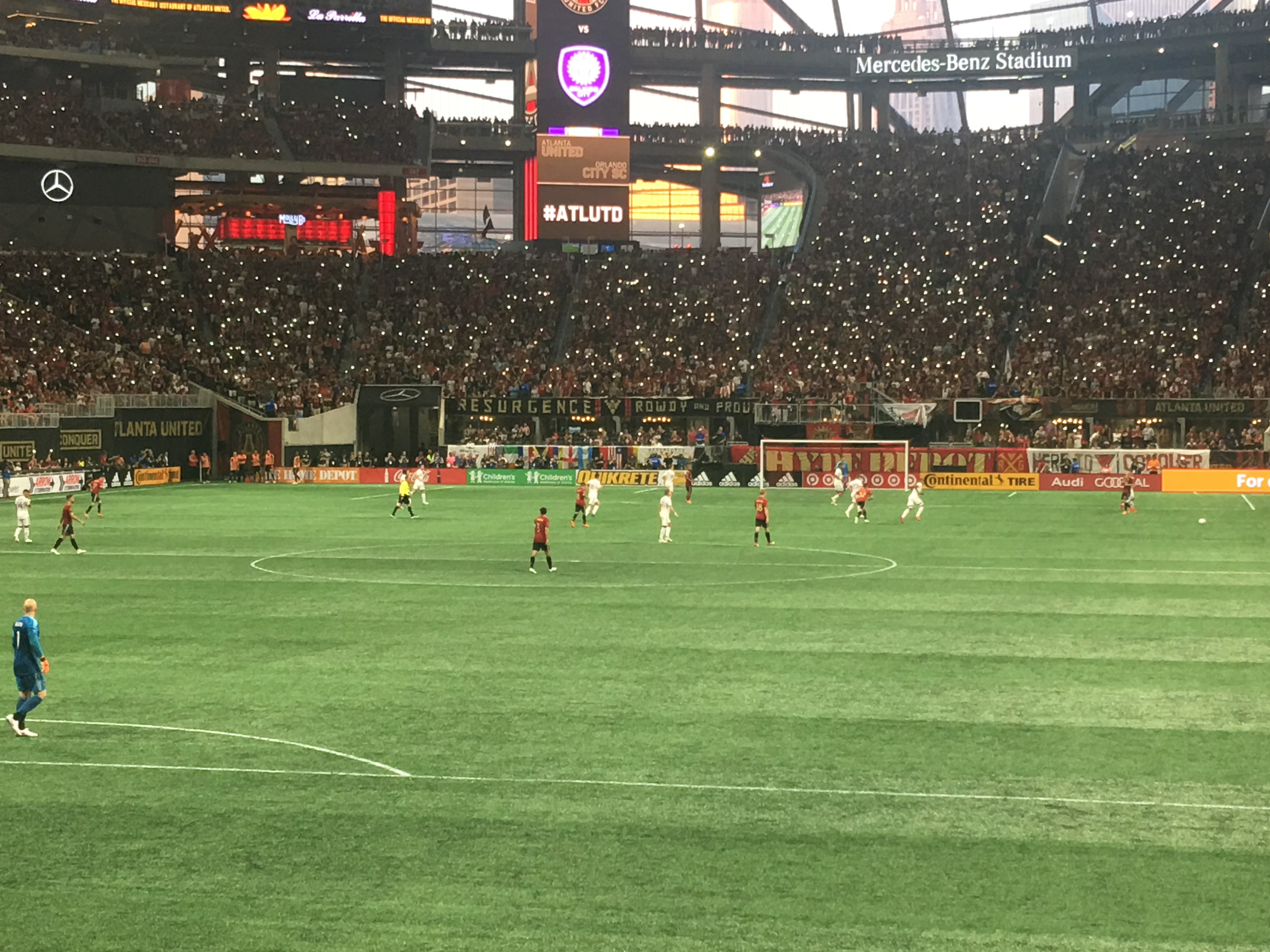
June 30, 2018 18	Atlanta United	4–0	Orlando City SC	Atlanta, Georgia
7:00 p.m. EDT	Martínez 3'; Almirón 55', 78'; Barco 57'	Report	Johnson (yellow card) 19'	Stadium: Mercedes-Benz Stadium; Attendance: 71,932; Referee: Kevin Stott
Note: 2018-06-30 - Atlanta United vs Orlando City

July 4, 2018 19	FC Dallas	3–2	Atlanta United	Frisco, Texas
8:00 p.m. EDT	Lamah (yellow card) 14'; Ziegler 22'; Akindele 86', 88'	Report	Martínez 41', 73'; Escobar (yellow card) 45'	Stadium: Toyota Stadium; Attendance: 17,298; Referee: Alan Kelly

July 7, 2018 20	Philadelphia Union	0–2	Atlanta United	Chester, Pennsylvania
7:00 p.m. EDT	McKenzie (yellow card) 19'; Blake (yellow card) 57'	Report	Parkhurst (yellow card) 21'; Martínez 58' (pen.); Villalba 76'	Stadium: Talen Energy Stadium; Attendance: 17,025; Referee: Ismail Elfath

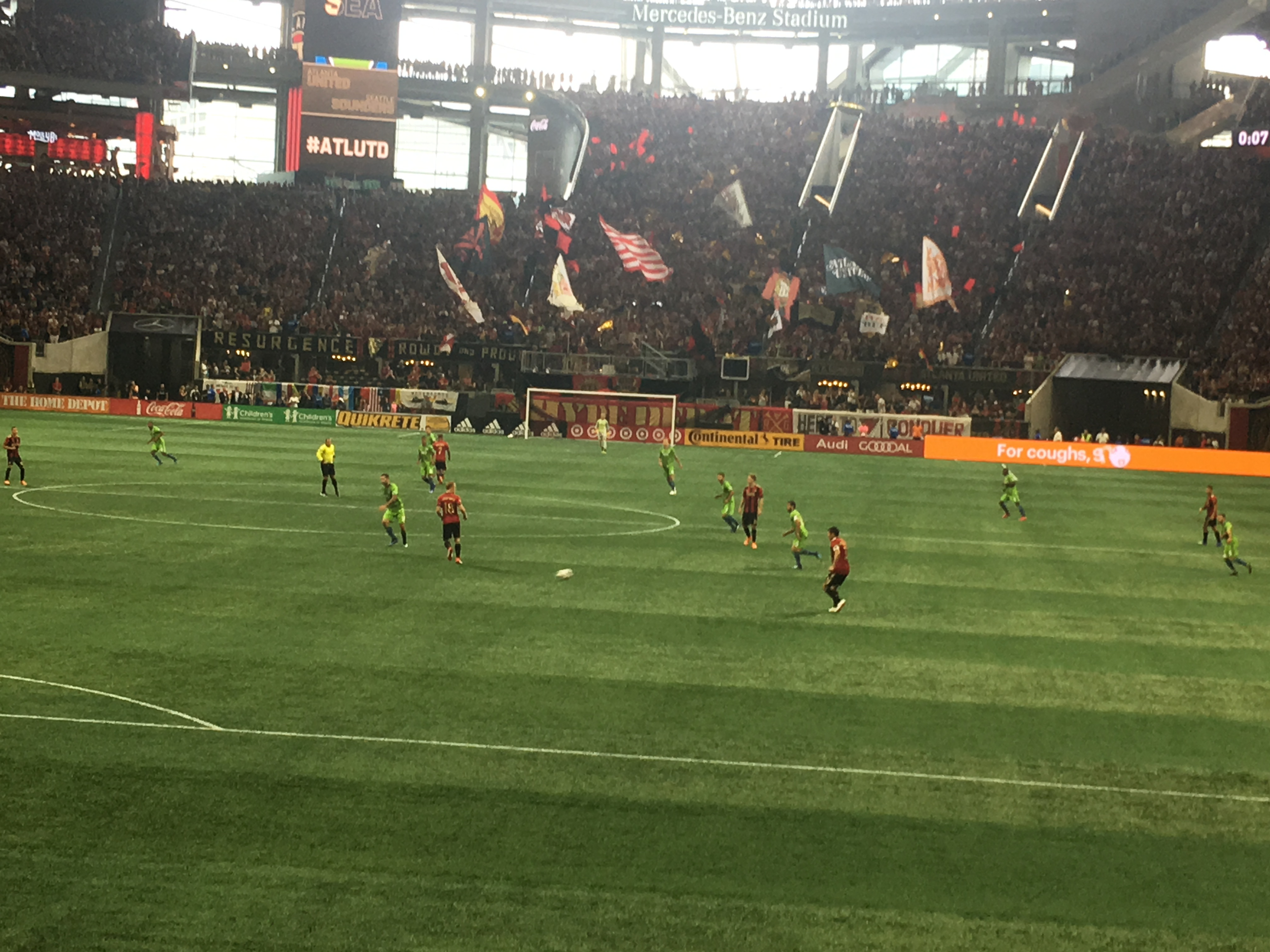
July 15, 2018 21	Atlanta United	1–1	Seattle Sounders FC	Atlanta, Georgia
2:00 p.m. EDT	González Pírez (yellow card) 15'; Escobar (yellow card) 44'; Martínez 48'; Parkhurst (yellow card) 56'	Report	McCrary (yellow card) 26' (yellow-red card) 63'; Lodeiro 45' (pen.), (yellow card) 90+4'	Stadium: Mercedes-Benz Stadium; Attendance: 72,243; Referee: Baldomero Toledo
Note: 2018-07-15 - Atlanta United vs Seattle Sounders

July 21, 2018 22	Atlanta United	3–1	D.C. United	Atlanta, Georgia
3:30 p.m. EDT	Martínez 30', 54', 73'	Report	Stieber 8'; Arriola (yellow card) 49'; Rooney (yellow card) 50'; Durkin (yellow card) 78'	Stadium: Mercedes-Benz Stadium; Attendance: 45,087; Referee: Drew Fischer

July 28, 2018 23	Montreal Impact	1–2	Atlanta United	Montreal, Quebec
7:30 p.m. EDT	Piatti 87'	Report	Escobar (yellow card) 23'; Martínez 31', 57'; Parkhurst (yellow card) 77'	Stadium: Saputo Stadium; Attendance: 19,064; Referee: Hilario Grajeda

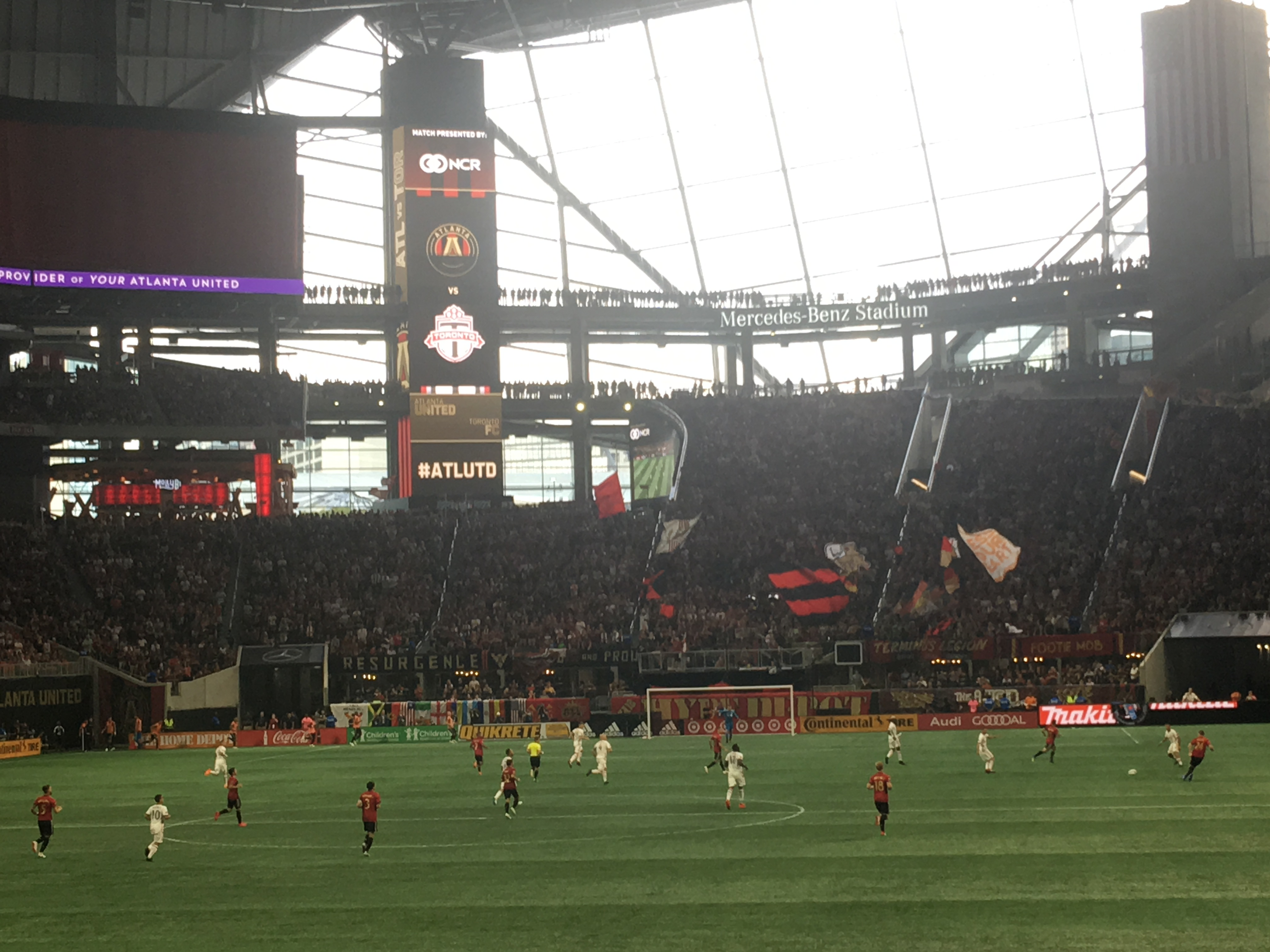
August 4, 2018 24	Atlanta United	2–2	Toronto FC	Atlanta, Georgia
4:00 p.m. EDT	Martínez 53' (pen.), 67'; Remedi (yellow card) 72'; Larentowicz (yellow card) 74'	Report	Giovinco 45+1', (yellow card) 60'; Bono (yellow card) 52'; Ricketts 90+1'; Mavinga (red card) 90+5'	Stadium: Mercedes-Benz Stadium; Attendance: 45,191; Referee: Armando Villarreal
Note: 2018-08-04 - Atlanta United vs Toronto FC

August 19, 2018 25	Atlanta United	3–1	Columbus Crew	Atlanta, Georgia
4:00 p.m. EDT	Martínez 31'; McCann (yellow card) 45+1'; Villalba 76', (yellow card) 86'; Almirón 82', (yellow card) 83'; Guzan (yellow card) 88'	Report	Zardes 50'; Artur (yellow card) 90+4'	Stadium: Mercedes-Benz Stadium; Attendance: 45,303; Referee: Jair Marrufo

August 24, 2018 26	Orlando City SC	1–2	Atlanta United	Orlando, Florida
8:00 p.m. EDT	Sutter 39'; Johnson (yellow card) 60'; Rosell (yellow card) 86'; Spector (yellow card) 90+3'	Report	González Pírez 21'; Martínez 74', (yellow card) 75'	Stadium: Orlando City Stadium; Attendance: 25,058; Referee: Ismail Elfath

September 2, 2018 27	D.C. United	3–1	Atlanta United	Washington, D.C.
5:30 p.m. EDT	Acosta 29', 77'; Rooney 52' (pen.); Moreno (yellow card) 73'	Report	Remedi (yellow card) 25'; Larentowicz 39'; Barco (yellow card) 51'; González Pírez (yellow card) 71'	Stadium: Audi Field; Attendance: 20,557; Referee: Allen Chapman

September 15, 2018 28	Colorado Rapids	0–3	Atlanta United	Commerce City, Colorado
3:30 p.m. EDT	Ford (yellow card) 34'; Castillo (yellow card) 45+3'; Gashi (yellow card) 90+4'	Report	Almirón 10', 18'; Villalba 37', (yellow card) 45+4'	Stadium: Dick's Sporting Goods Park; Attendance: 14,788; Referee: Sorin Stoica

September 19, 2018 29	San Jose Earthquakes	3–4	Atlanta United	San Jose, California
11:00 p.m. EDT	Lima 13'; Hoesen 43'; Salinas (yellow card) 53'; Qazaishvili 58'	Report	Escobar (yellow card) 7'; Larentowicz (yellow card) 18'; Villalba 45+3'; Martínez 70' (pen.), 90+5'; Almirón 73'	Stadium: Avaya Stadium; Attendance: 15,948; Referee: Fotis Bazakos

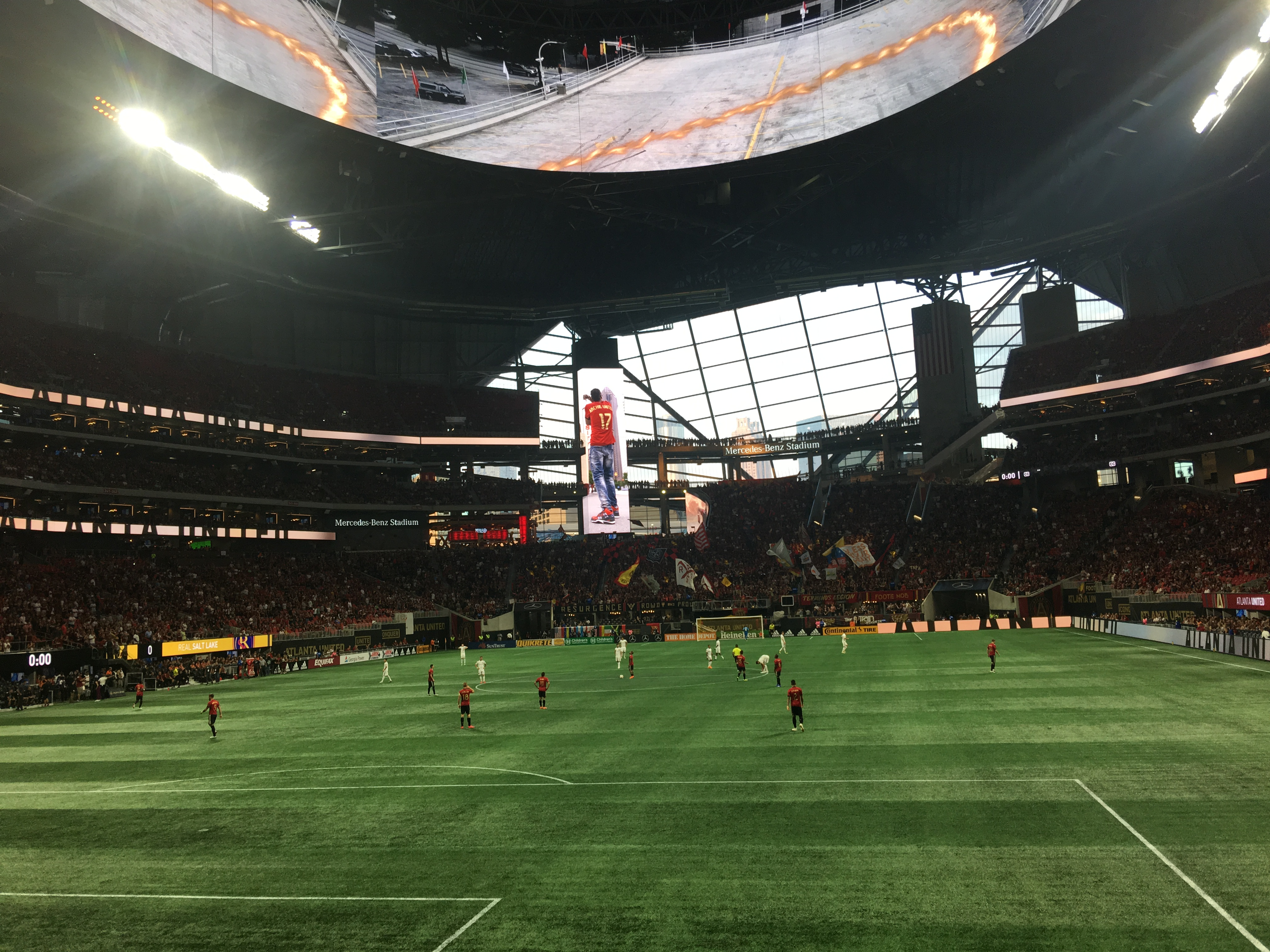
September 22, 2018 30	Atlanta United	2–0	Real Salt Lake	Atlanta, Georgia
7:00 p.m. EDT	Gressel 37'; Villalba 61'	Report	Sunny (yellow card) 43'	Stadium: Mercedes-Benz Stadium; Attendance: 72,017; Referee: Hilario Grajeda
Note: 2018-09-22 - Atlanta United vs Real Salt Lake

September 30, 2018 31	New York Red Bulls	2–0	Atlanta United	Harrison, New Jersey
1:00 p.m. EDT	Royer 39' (pen.); Parker (yellow card) 45+1', (goal) 74'; Ivan (yellow card) 88'; Etienne (yellow card) 90+2'	Report	McCann (yellow card) 38'; Gressel (yellow card) 43'; Parkhurst (yellow card) 79'	Stadium: Red Bull Arena; Attendance: 22,057; Referee: Robert Sibiga

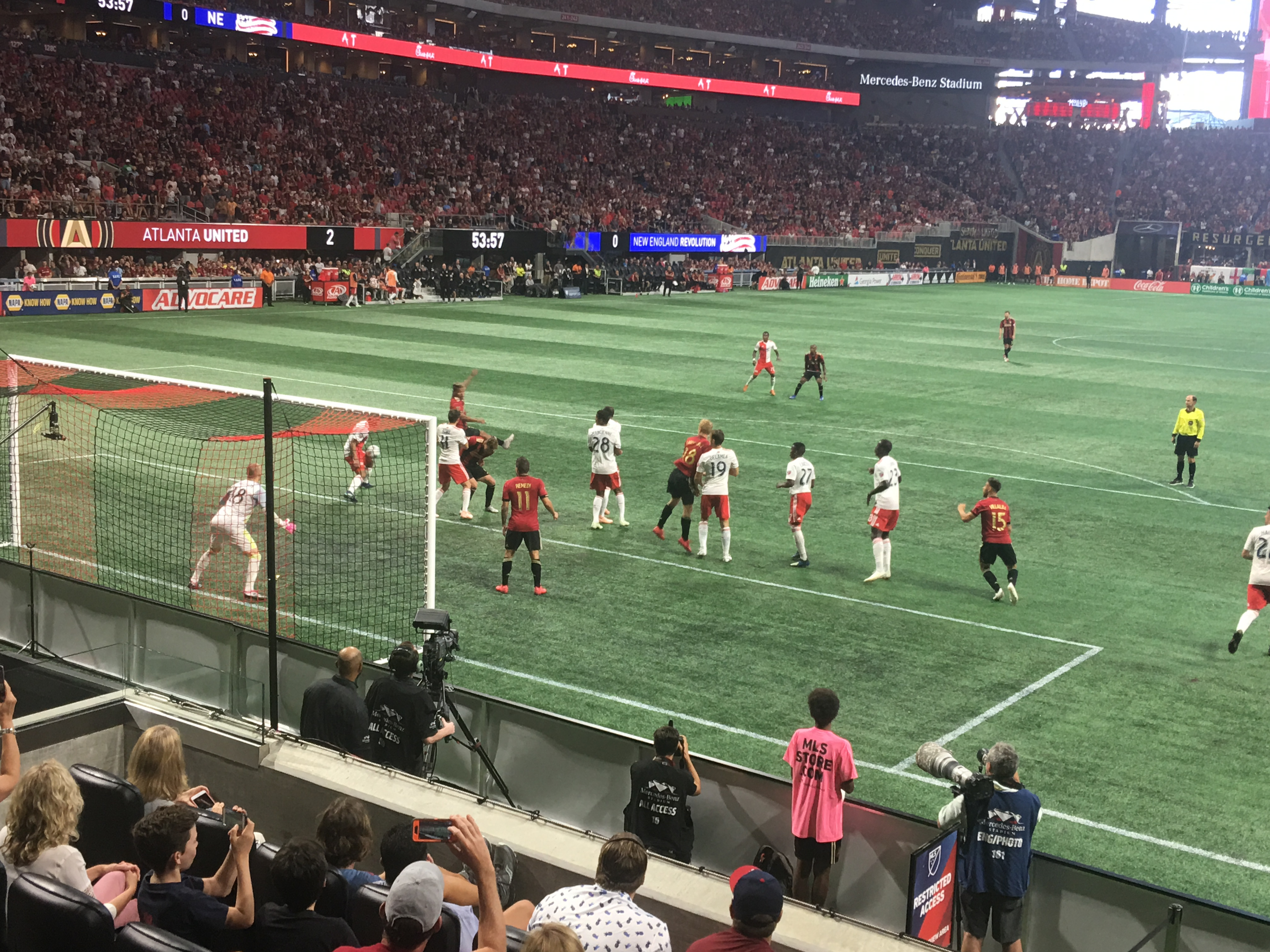
October 6, 2018 32	Atlanta United	2–1	New England Revolution	Atlanta, Georgia
3:30 p.m. EDT	Bello 17'; Gressel 52'	Report	Zahibo (yellow card) 16'; Herivaux (yellow card) 38'; Hauche (yellow card) 56'; Caicedo (yellow card) 64'; Agudelo 90+2'	Stadium: Mercedes-Benz Stadium; Attendance: 45,122; Referee: Kevin Stott
Note: 2018-10-06 - Atlanta United vs New England Revolution

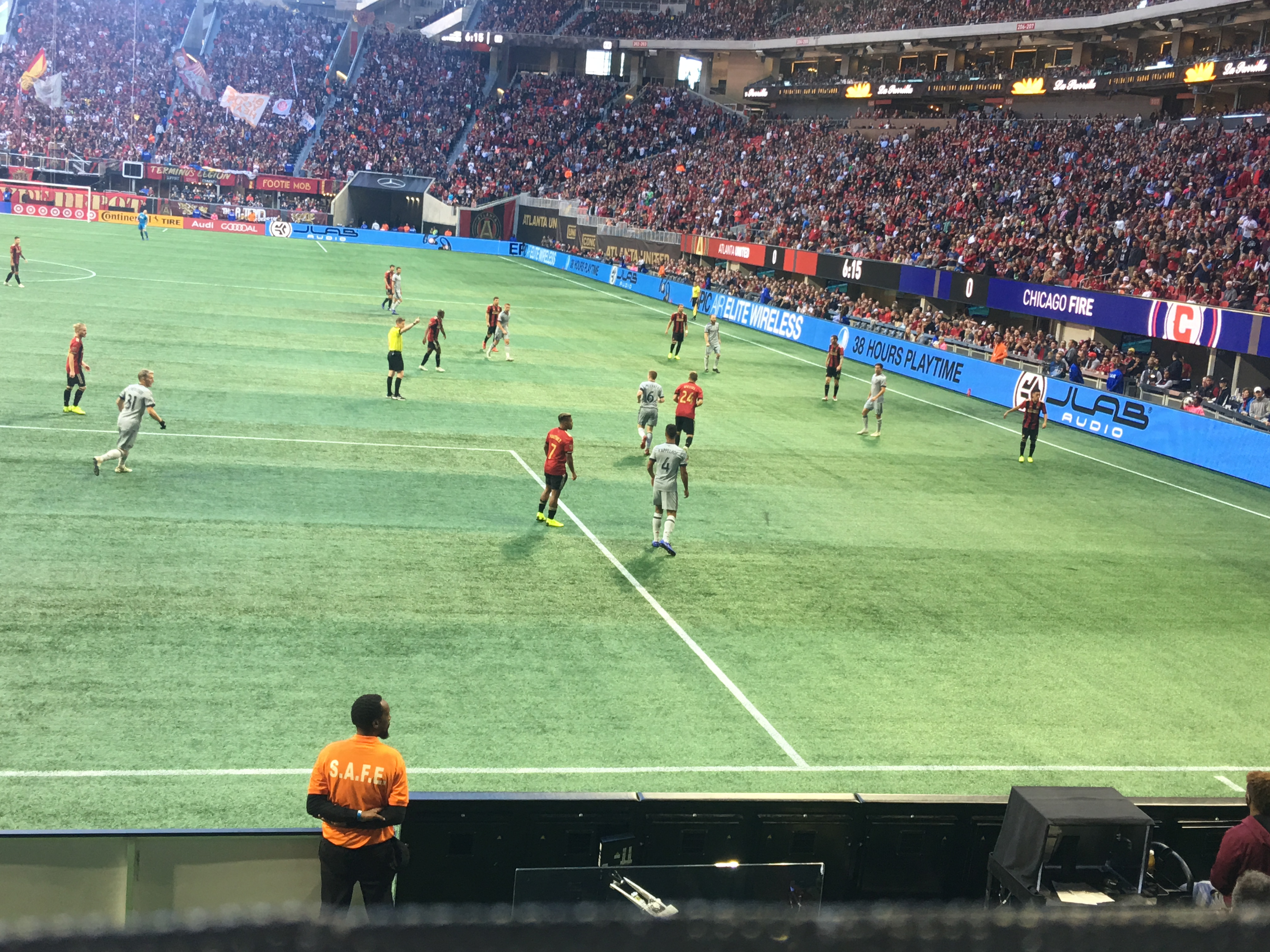
October 21, 2018 33	Atlanta United	2–1	Chicago Fire	Atlanta, Georgia
3:00 p.m. EDT	Escobar 9'; Kappelhof 26' (o.g.); Remedi (yellow card) 81'	Report	de Leeuw 24'; Kappelhof (yellow card) 72'	Stadium: Mercedes-Benz Stadium; Attendance: 71,812; Referee: Drew Fischer
Note: 2018-10-21 - Atlanta United vs Chicago Fire

October 28, 2018 34	Toronto FC	4–1	Atlanta United	Toronto, Ontario
4:30 p.m. EDT	Janson 9', 83'; Delgado 21'; Giovinco 88'	Report	Martínez 77' (pen.)	Stadium: BMO Field; Attendance: 23,895; Referee: Jair Marrufo

==== MLS Cup Playoffs ====
November 4, 2018 Semifinal Leg 1	New York City FC	0–1	Atlanta United	New York, New York
7:30 p.m. EST	Moralez (yellow card) 10'; Ring (yellow card) 41'	Report	Remedi (yellow card) 7', (goal) 37'; Villalba (yellow card) 48'; Martínez (yellow card) 78'	Stadium: Yankee Stadium; Attendance: 19,198; Referee: Kevin Stott

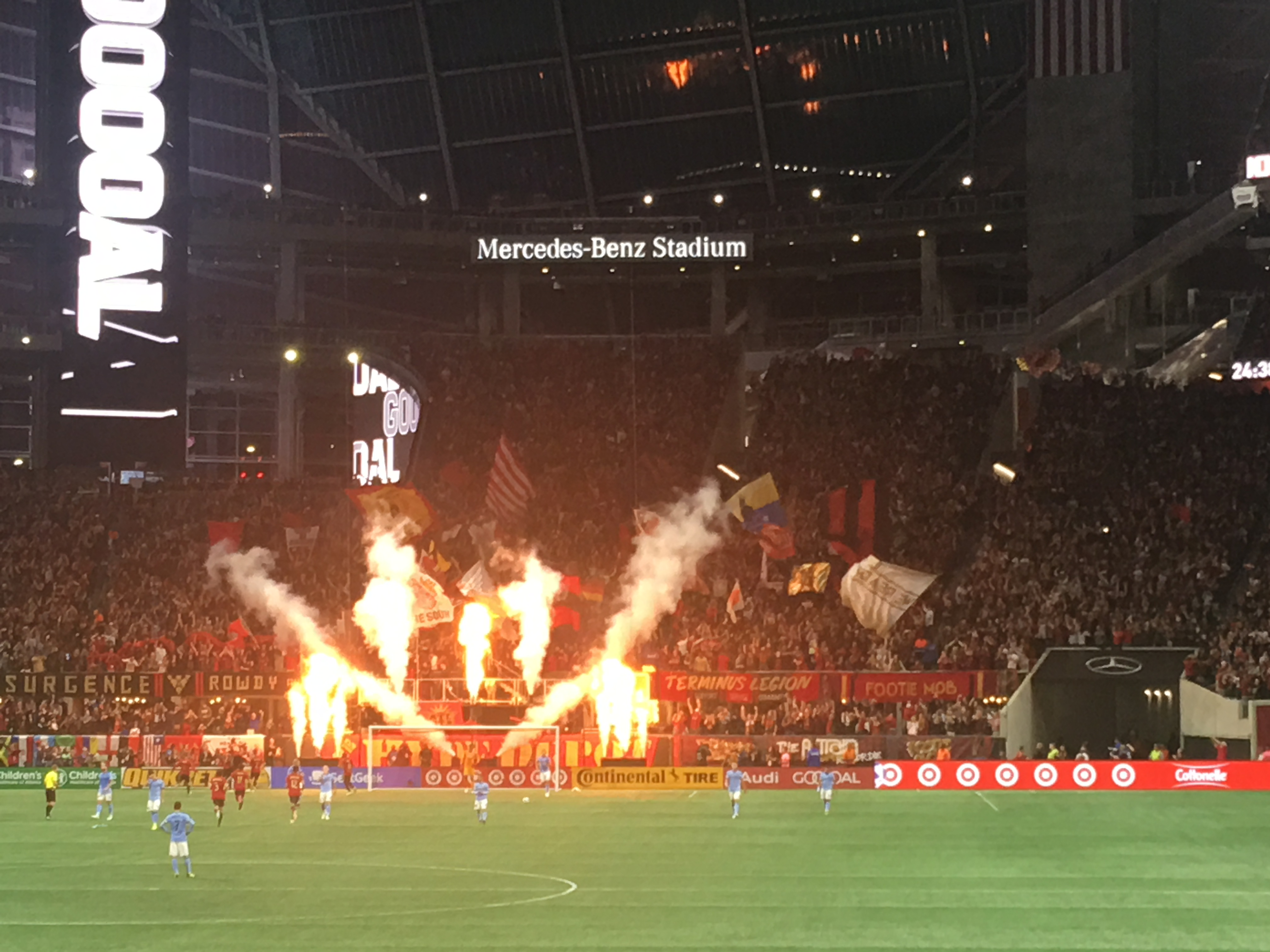
November 11, 2018 Semifinal Leg 2	Atlanta United	3–1 (4–1 agg.)	New York City FC	Atlanta, Georgia
5:30 p.m. EST	Martínez 25' (pen.), 83'; Almirón 42'; Escobar (yellow card) 44'; Robinson (yellow card) 61'	Report	Chanot (yellow card) 6', (goal) 45'; Herrera (yellow card) 40'; Moralez (yellow card) 74'; Callens (yellow card) 88'	Stadium: Mercedes-Benz Stadium; Attendance: 70,526; Referee: Mark Geiger
Note: 2018-11-11 - Atlanta United vs NYCFC

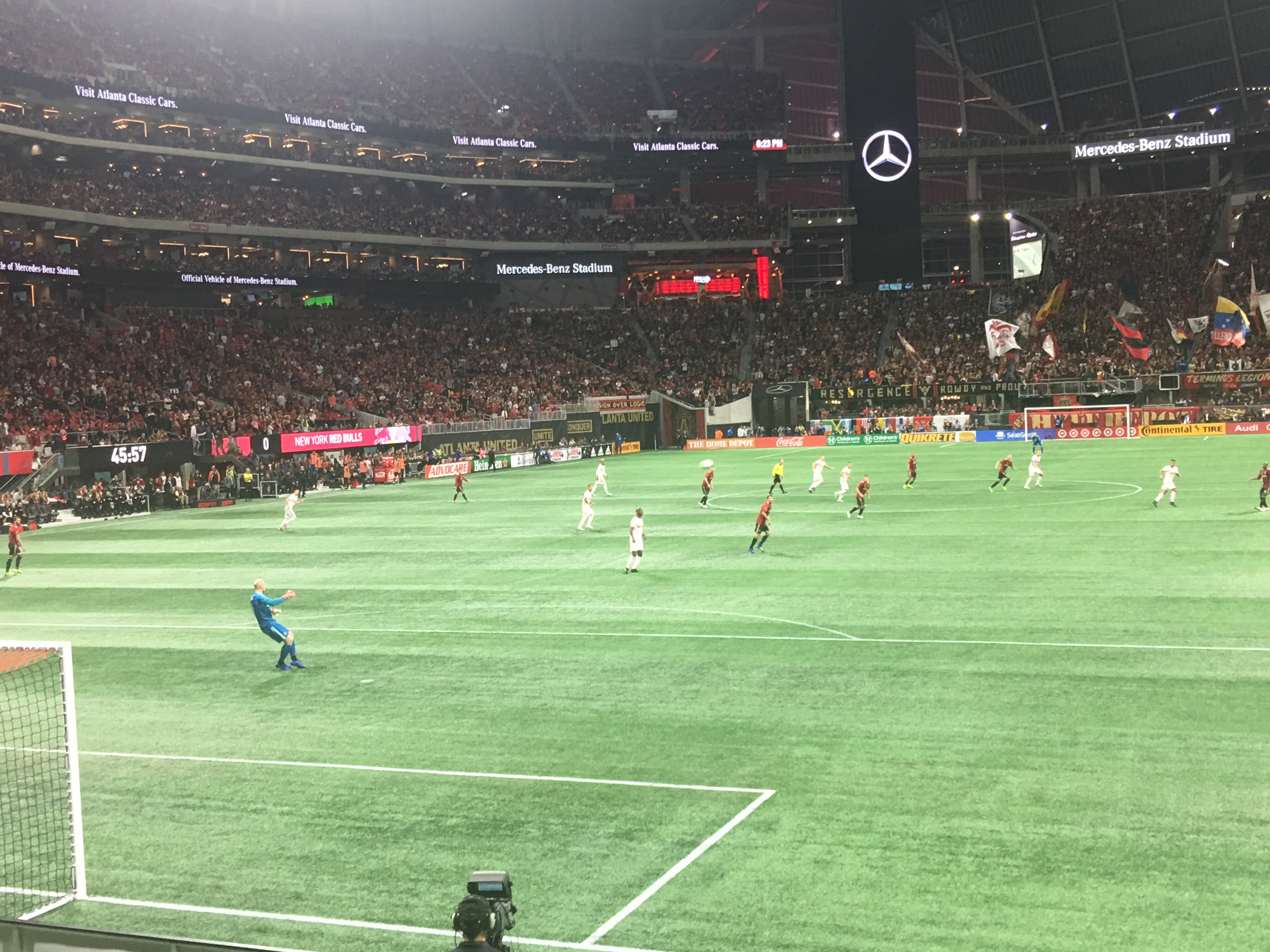
November 25, 2018 Final Leg 1	Atlanta United	3–0	New York Red Bulls	Atlanta, Georgia
5:00 p.m. EST	Martínez 32'; González Pírez (yellow card) 62'; Escobar 71'; Villalba 90+5'	Report		Stadium: Mercedes-Benz Stadium; Attendance: 70,016; Referee: Kevin Stott
Note: 2018-11-25 - Atlanta United vs NY Red Bulls

November 29, 2018 Final Leg 2	New York Red Bulls	1–0 (1–3 agg.)	Atlanta United	Harrison, New Jersey
7:30 p.m. EST	Parker (yellow card) 64', (goal) 90+4'	Report		Stadium: Red Bull Arena; Attendance: 22,137; Referee: Jair Marrufo

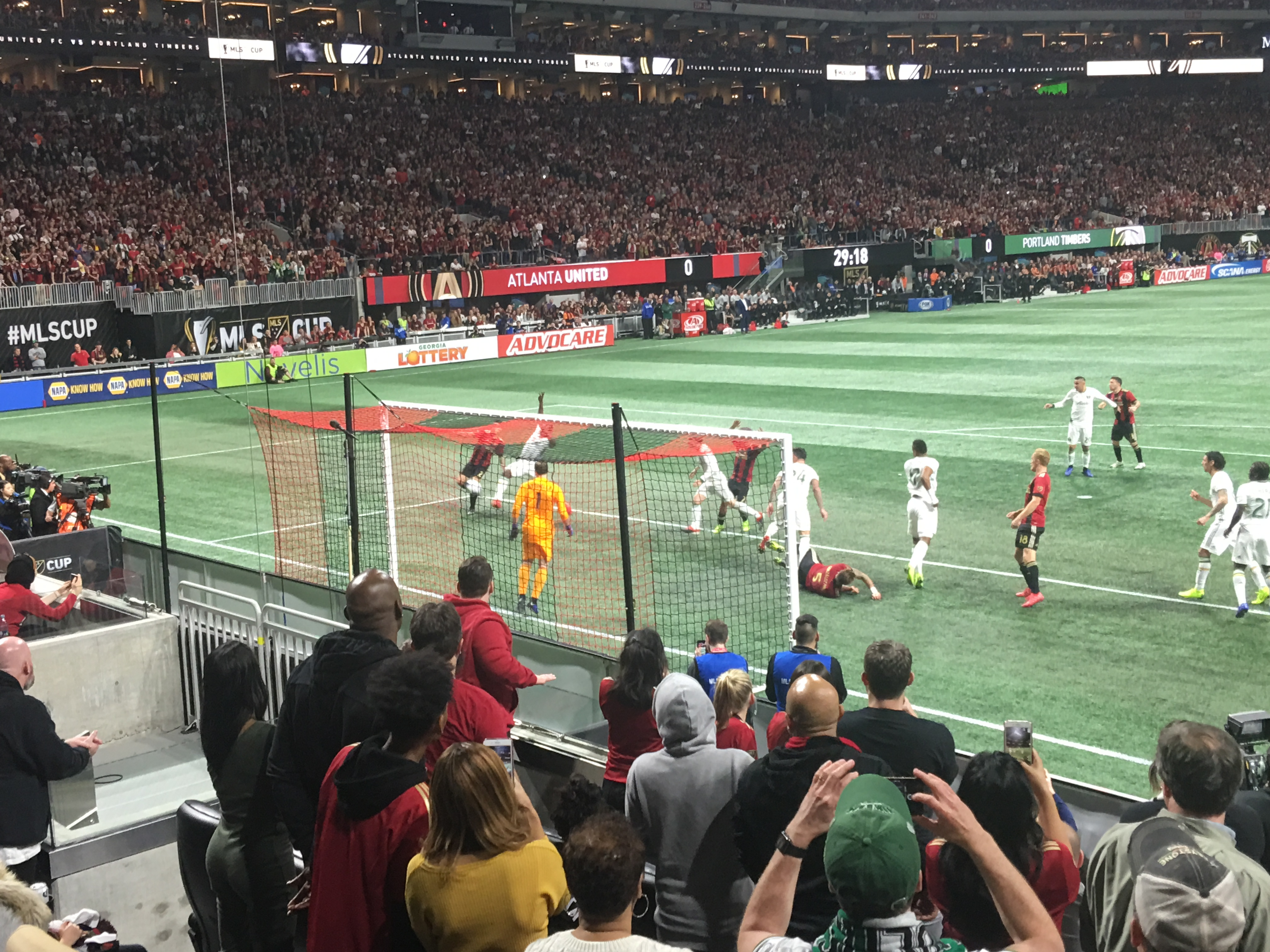
December 8, 2018 MLS Cup Final	Atlanta United	2–0	Portland Timbers	Atlanta, Georgia
8:00 p.m. EST	Martínez 39'; Escobar 54'; McCann (yellow card) 90+4'	Report	Chará (yellow card) 80'	Stadium: Mercedes-Benz Stadium; Attendance: 73,019; Referee: Alan Kelly
Note: 2018-12-08 - Atlanta United vs Portland

==== U.S. Open Cup ====
Win Draw Loss

June 6, 2018 Fourth round	Atlanta United	3–0	Charleston Battery	Kennesaw, Georgia
7:30 p.m. EDT	Carleton 14'; Barco 47' (pen.); Williams 64'	Report	Candela (yellow card) 86'	Stadium: Fifth Third Bank Stadium; Attendance: 9,742; Referee: Guido Gonzalez Jr.

June 20, 2018 Round of 16	Atlanta United	0–1	Chicago Fire	Atlanta, Georgia
7:30 p.m. EDT	González Pírez (yellow card) 81'	Report	Katai (yellow card) 39'; Nikolić 54'	Stadium: Mercedes-Benz Stadium; Attendance: 41,012; Referee: Rubiel Vazquez

== Statistics ==
=== Top scorers ===
As of December 9, 2018

Place	Position	Name	MLS	Playoffs	U.S. Open Cup	Total
1	FW	(Venezuela) Josef Martínez	31	4	0	35
2	MF	(Paraguay) Miguel Almirón	12	1	0	13
3	MF	(Paraguay) Héctor Villalba	7	1	0	8
4	MF	(Argentina) Ezequiel Barco	4	0	1	5
5	MF	(Germany) Julian Gressel	4	0	0	4
6	DF	(Argentina) Franco Escobar	1	2	0	3
7	MF	(Germany) Kevin Kratz	2	0	0	2
7	FW	(Jamaica) Romario Williams	1	0	1	2
9	DF	(United States) George Bello	1	0	0	1
9	MF	(United States) Andrew Carleton	0	0	1	1
9	DF	(United States) Greg Garza	1	0	0	1
9	DF	(Argentina) Leandro González Pírez	1	0	0	1
9	MF	(United States) Jeff Larentowicz	1	0	0	1
9	DF	(Republic of Ireland) Chris McCann	1	0	0	1
9	MF	(Argentina) Eric Remedi	0	1	0	1
Own Goals			3	0	0	3
Total			70	9	3	82

=== Disciplinary record ===
As of December 9, 2018

No.	Pos.	Name	MLS			MLS Cup Playoffs			U.S. Open Cup			Total		
No.	Pos.	Name	Booked	(yellow card) (yellow-red card)	Sent off (straight red)	Booked	(yellow card) (yellow-red card)	Sent off (straight red)	Booked	(yellow card) (yellow-red card)	Sent off (straight red)	Booked	(yellow card) (yellow-red card)	Sent off (straight red)
1	GK	Brad Guzan	3		1							3		1
2	DF	Franco Escobar	7			1						8		
3	DF	Michael Parkhurst	6									6		
4	DF	Greg Garza	2		1							2		1
5	DF	Leandro González Pírez	7	1		1			1			9	1	
7	FW	Josef Martínez	1			1						2		
8	MF	Ezequiel Barco	2									2		
9	FW	Romario Williams	4									4		
10	MF	Miguel Almirón	4									4		
11	MF	Eric Remedi	3			1						4		
12	DF	Miles Robinson				1						1		
15	MF	Héctor Villalba	5			1						6		
16	MF	Chris McCann	6			1						7		
18	MF	Jeff Larentowicz	6									6		
22	DF	Mikey Ambrose	1									1		
24	MF	Julian Gressel	3									3		
Total			59	1	2	7	0	0	1	0	0	67	1	2

== Player movement ==
=== In ===
No.	Pos.	Player	Transferred from	Type	US	Fee/notes	Date	Source
31	ST	(Nigeria) Patrick Okonkwo	(United States) Atlanta United Academy	Transfer	US	Signed as a Homegrown Player (HGP)	June 17, 2017 (Note: On June 17, 2017 Atlanta United academy players Patrick Okonkwo, George Bello, and Lagos Kunga signed Homegrown Player (HGP) contracts with the senior team, to be effective as of January 1, 2018.)	
21	DF	(United States) George Bello	(United States) Atlanta United Academy	Transfer	US	Signed as a Homegrown Player (HGP)	June 17, 2017	
23	MF	(United States) Lagos Kunga	(United States) Atlanta United Academy	Transfer	US	Signed as a Homegrown Player (HGP)	June 17, 2017	
4	DF	(United States) Greg Garza	(Mexico) Tijuana	Transfer	US	Undisclosed	November 29, 2017	
27	GK	(United States) Mitch Hildebrandt	(United States) FC Cincinnati	Transfer	US	Free	December 1, 2017	
2	DF	(Argentina) Franco Escobar	(Argentina) Newell's Old Boys	Transfer	Non-US	Undisclosed	December 8, 2017	
13	DF	(Venezuela) José Hernández	(Venezuela) Caracas	Transfer	Non-US	Undisclosed	December 13, 2017	
6	MF	(United States) Darlington Nagbe	(United States) Portland Timbers	Trade	US	Included in multi-person trade. (Note: Portland Timbers traded Darlington Nagbe and Gbenga Arokoyo to Atlanta in exchange for $650K in GAM in 2018, $100K in GAM in 2019, $300K in TAM and a 2018 international roster slot. Arokoyo was never on the club's official roster and later signed for Kalmar FF.)	December 13, 2017	
—	DF	(Nigeria) Gbenga Arokoyo	(United States) Portland Timbers	Trade	Non-US	Included in multi-person trade.	December 13, 2017	
9	ST	(Jamaica) Romario Williams	(United States) Charleston Battery	Loan Return	US	Free	December 31, 2017	
—	ST	(Ghana) Jeffrey Otoo	(United States) Charleston Battery	Loan Return	Non-US	Free	December 31, 2017	
8	MF	(Argentina) Ezequiel Barco	(Argentina) Independiente	Transfer	Non-US	$15 Million	January 19, 2018	
26	FW	(Republic of Ireland) Jon Gallagher	(United States) University of Notre Dame	Draft	Non-US	Free	January 19, 2018	
—	FW	(Germany) Gordon Wild	(United States) University of Maryland	Draft	Non-US	Free	January 19, 2018	
14	DF	(United States) Sal Zizzo	(United States) New York Red Bulls	Transfer	US	Free	January 30, 2018	
29	MF	(England) Oliver Shannon	(United States) Clemson University	Draft	Non-US	Free	February 21, 2018	
11	MF	(Argentina) Eric Remedi	(Argentina) Banfield	Transfer	Non-US	Undisclosed; Required TAM	June 26, 2018	

==== SuperDraft picks ====
Draft picks are not automatically signed to the team roster. Only trades involving draft picks and executed after the start of 2018 MLS SuperDraft will be listed in the notes. Atlanta had four selections in the draft.

2018 Atlanta United SuperDraft Picks
Round	Selection	Player	Position	College	Status
1	14	(Republic of Ireland) Jon Gallagher	FW	Notre Dame	Non-US
2	36	(England) Oliver Shannon	MF	Clemson	Non-US
2	37	(Germany) Gordon Wild	FW	Maryland	Non-US
4	70	(United States) Paul Christensen	GK	Portland	US

==== Loan in ====
No.	Pos.	Player	Loaned from	US	Start	End	Source
33	GK	(United States) Paul Christensen	(United States) Atlanta United 2	US	May 4, 2018	May 8, 2018	
33	GK	(United States) Paul Christensen	(United States) Atlanta United 2	US	May 8, 2018	May 10, 2018	
34	FW	(United States) Yosef Samuel	(United States) Atlanta United 2	US	June 5, 2018	June 9, 2018	

=== Out ===
Per Major League Soccer and club policies terms of the deals do not get disclosed.

No.	Pos.	Player	Transferred to	Type	US	Fee/notes	Date	Source
21	DF	(United States) Mark Bloom	Free Agent (Note: Later retired from professional soccer.)	Option Declined	US	Free	November 20, 2017	
12	DF	(United States) Bobby Boswell	Free Agent	Contract Expired	US	Free	November 20, 2017	
9	FW	(Trinidad and Tobago) Kenwyne Jones	(United States) Sporting Kansas City (Note: Following Atlanta United declining contract options on both players, the club traded the rights to Kenwyne Jones and Alexandros Tabakis along with their natural fourth round pick in the 2021 MLS SuperDraft to Sporting Kansas City in exchange for the rights to Kévin Oliveira and Tyler Pasher as well as Sporting Kansas City's natural second round pick in the 2018 MLS SuperDraft. Sporting Kansas City had declined contract options on Oliveira and Pasher on November 27, 2017. Neither player was ever on Atlanta's official roster. Oliveira and Pasher later signed with Ottawa Fury and Indy Eleven, respectively. Jones had already retired at the time of the transaction, and Tabakis later signed with North Carolina FC.)	Option Declined	US	Free	November 20, 2017	
27	DF	(United States) Zach Loyd	Free Agent	Option Declined	US	Free	November 20, 2017	
2	DF	(England) Tyrone Mears	(United States) Minnesota United FC (Note: After Atlanta United declined Mears' contract option, he was selected by Minnesota United FC in the 2017 MLS Re-Entry Draft.)	Option Declined	Non-US	Free	November 20, 2017	
—	FW	(Ghana) Jeffrey Otoo	Free Agent	Option Declined	Non-US	Free	November 20, 2017	
25	GK	(United States) Kyle Reynish	(United States) Fresno FC	Contract Expired	US	Free	November 20, 2017	
23	GK	(Greece) Alexandros Tabakis	(United States) Sporting Kansas City	Option Declined	US	Free	November 20, 2017	
13	MF	(England) Harrison Heath	(United States) Minnesota United FC	Trade	US	Received 2019 fourth-round pick	December 10, 2017	
26	DF	(England) Anton Walkes	(England) Tottenham Hotspur	Loan Return	Non-US	Free	December 31, 2017	
11	MF	(Argentina) Yamil Asad	(Argentina) Vélez Sarsfield	Loan Return	Non-US	Free	December 31, 2017	
14	MF	(Chile) Carlos Carmona	(Chile) Colo-Colo	Transfer	Non-US	Undisclosed	January 30, 2018	
29	MF	(United States) Jacob Peterson	Free Agent	Waived	US	Free	January 29, 2018	
—	DF	(Nigeria) Gbenga Arokoyo	(Sweden) Kalmar FF	Transfer	Non-US	Free	January 31, 2018	

==== Loan out ====
No.	Pos.	Player	Loaned to	Start	End	Source
31	FW	(Nigeria) Patrick Okonkwo	(United States) Charleston Battery	February 17, 2018	October 20, 2018	
—	FW	(Germany) Gordon Wild	(United States) Charleston Battery	February 17, 2018	October 20, 2018	
29	MF	(England) Oliver Shannon	(United States) Atlanta United 2	February 17, 2018	October 13, 2018	
13	DF	(Venezuela) José Hernández	(United States) Atlanta United 2	July 15, 2018	August 19, 2018	
26	FW	(Republic of Ireland) Jon Gallagher	(United States) Atlanta United 2	August 19, 2018	October 13, 2018	

Due to a surplus of players under contract that required an International Roster Slot, Oliver Shannon was loaned to Atlanta United 2 for the full 2018 season. In addition, as part of Eric Remedi's incoming transfer, José Hernández was officially loaned to Atlanta United 2. Neither player could be recalled to the first team without an additional corresponding roster transaction. Players on the first team roster were able play for the second team without restriction.

On August 19, Hernández was in the matchday squad for the first team's match against the Columbus Crew. In order for this to be in compliance with league roster rules, Atlanta had to send forward Jon Gallagher on loan to Atlanta United 2 for the rest of the season and recall Hernández from the second team.

=== Non-player transfers ===
Acquired	From	For	Source
2018 Fourth Round Pick	(United States) Los Angeles FC	International roster slot - 2018	
2018 Second Round Pick	(United States) Sporting Kansas City	2021 Fourth Round Pick	
Up to $600K in TAM ($500K minimum)	(United States) D.C. United	Discovery rights for Yamil Asad	
$50K in GAM	(United States) New York Red Bulls	Discovery rights for Kaku	

== Honors ==
=== Weekly / monthly ===
==== MLS player of the month ====
Month	Player	Stats	Ref
April	(Paraguay) Miguel Almirón	4 GP, 5 G, 2 A	
July	(Venezuela) Josef Martínez	5 GP, 9 G, 1 A	
August	(Venezuela) Josef Martínez (2)	4 GP, 4 G, 1 A	

==== MLS team / player / coach of the week ====
Week	Team of the week		Player of the week	Coach of the week	Ref
Week	Starting XI	Bench	Player of the week	Coach of the week	Ref
2	(Germany) Julian Gressel	(Paraguay) Miguel Almirón			
3	(Venezuela) Josef Martínez	(Germany) Julian Gressel (2)	(Venezuela) Josef Martínez		
5	(United States) Michael Parkhurst				
6	(Germany) Julian Gressel (3) (United States) Michael Parkhurst (2)	(Paraguay) Miguel Almirón (2)		(Argentina) Gerardo Martino	
7	(Paraguay) Miguel Almirón (3)				
8	(Paraguay) Miguel Almirón (4)				
9	(Paraguay) Miguel Almirón (5)	(Germany) Kevin Kratz (Argentina) Ezequiel Barco	(Paraguay) Miguel Almirón		
10		(Paraguay) Miguel Almirón (6)			
11		(United States) Jeff Larentowicz			
14	(Paraguay) Miguel Almirón (7) (Venezuela) Josef Martínez (2)		(Venezuela) Josef Martínez (2)		
15	(United States) Brad Guzan				
16	(United States) Michael Parkhurst (3) (United States) Jeff Larentowicz (2)	(Venezuela) Josef Martínez (3)		(Argentina) Gerardo Martino (2)	
17		(Germany) Julian Gressel (4)			
18	(Paraguay) Miguel Almirón (8)				
19	(Argentina) Leandro González Pírez	(Venezuela) Josef Martínez (4)			
21	(Venezuela) Josef Martínez (5)		(Venezuela) Josef Martínez (3)		
22	(Venezuela) Josef Martínez (6)				
23	(Venezuela) Josef Martínez (7)	(United States) Jeff Larentowicz (3)			
25		(Paraguay) Héctor Villalba			
26	(Venezuela) Josef Martínez (8)		(Venezuela) Josef Martínez (4)		
29	(Paraguay) Miguel Almirón (9) (Germany) Julian Gressel (5)	(Argentina) Leandro González Pírez (2)			
30	(Paraguay) Miguel Almirón (10) (Germany) Julian Gressel (6)	(Paraguay) Héctor Villalba (2) (Venezuela) Josef Martínez (9)			
32	(United States) George Bello	(Paraguay) Héctor Villalba (3)			
34		(Argentina) Franco Escobar			
Postseason	(Paraguay) Miguel Almirón (11) (Argentina) Franco Escobar (2) (Argentina) Leandro González Pírez (3) (Venezuela) Josef Martínez (10)	Not awarded			

==== MLS goal of the week ====
Week	Player	Ref
2	(Paraguay) Miguel Almirón	
3	(Venezuela) Josef Martínez	
9	(Germany) Kevin Kratz	
10	(Argentina) Ezequiel Barco	
15	(Venezuela) Josef Martínez (2)	
19	(Paraguay) Héctor Villalba	
26	(Venezuela) Josef Martínez (3)	
30	(Paraguay) Héctor Villalba (2)	

=== Annual ===
Honor	Player	Ref
MLS MVP	(Venezuela) Josef Martínez	
MLS Cup MVP	(Venezuela) Josef Martínez	
MLS Best XI	(Paraguay) Miguel Almirón (Venezuela) Josef Martínez	
MLS Golden Boot	(Venezuela) Josef Martínez	
MLS Coach of the Year	(Argentina) Gerardo Martino	
MLS All-Star Game	(Paraguay) Miguel Almirón (Argentina) Ezequiel Barco (United States) Brad Guzan (Venezuela) Josef Martínez (United States) Darlington Nagbe (Note: Injured at the time of the game and did not participate.) (United States) Michael Parkhurst	
MLS All-Star Game MVP	(Venezuela) Josef Martínez	
