= Héctor Villalba =

Argentine-born Paraguayan footballer (born 1994)

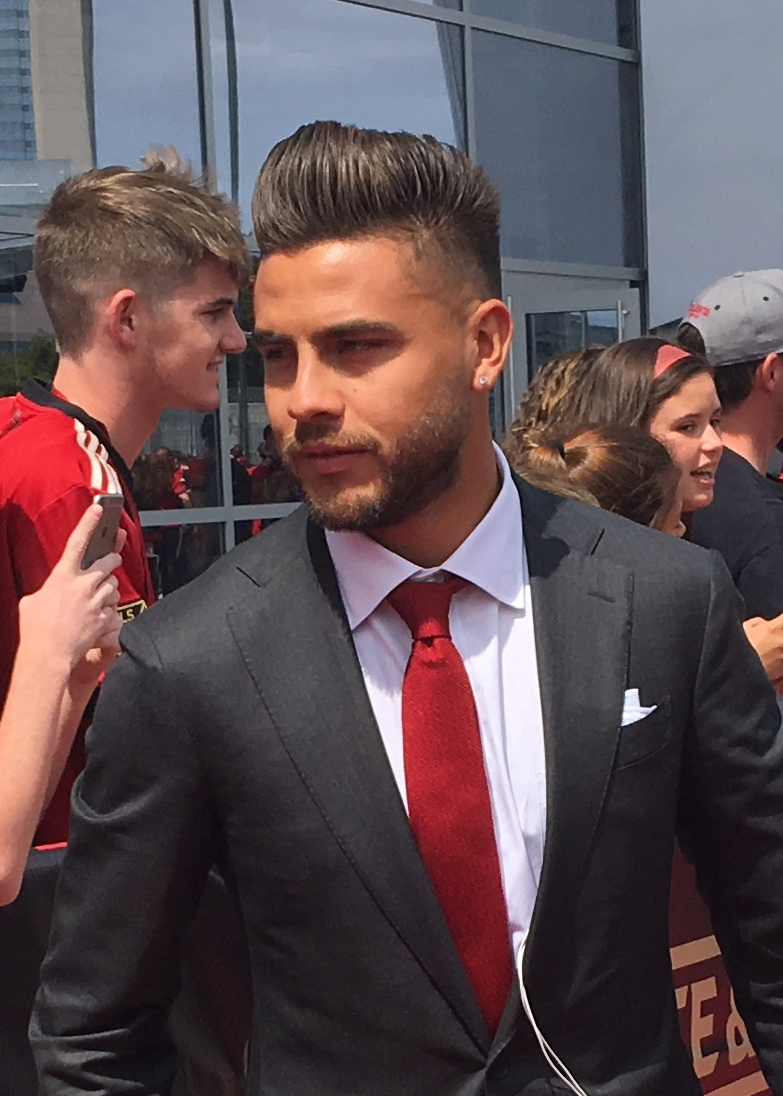
- Tito Villalba after signing the Golden Spike for Atlanta United on 10 September 2017

Personal information
- Full name: Héctor Daniel Villalba
- Date of birth: 26 July 1994 (age 32)
- Place of birth: Buenos Aires, Argentina
- Height: 1.73 m (5 ft 8 in)
- Positions: Winger; forward

Team information
- Current team: Peñarol
- Number: 8

Youth career
- 2004–2012: San Lorenzo

Senior career*
Years	Team	Apps	(Gls)
2012–2016	San Lorenzo	89	(15)
2016–2020	Atlanta United	82	(21)
2016	→ Tijuana (loan)	1	(0)
2020–2025	Libertad	98	(26)
2025	Peñarol	18	(3)
2026–	Barcelona SC	1	(1)

International career^{‡}
2018–	Paraguay	2	(0)
- * Club domestic league appearances and goals as of 06 July 2025 ‡ National team caps and goals as of 31 May 2019

Héctor Daniel "Tito" Villalba (born 26 July 1994) is a professional footballer who plays as a winger for Ecuadorian Serie A team Barcelona S.C. Born in Argentina, he represents Paraguay internationally.

== Club career ==
Villalba was born on 26 July 1994 and lived almost to maturity in the Villa 1–11–14. He arrived in San Lorenzo when he was 10, and was chosen after a test in which 500 boys were selected to start a path to professionalism. He confessed to being a fan of San Lorenzo, and went through all the lower levels at the club.

On 18 August 2012, he made his debut in the Primera Division Argentina, against Estudiantes de La Plata, when he entered in the 37th minute of the second half replacing Luis Aguiar, with Ricardo Caruso Lombardi as team manager.

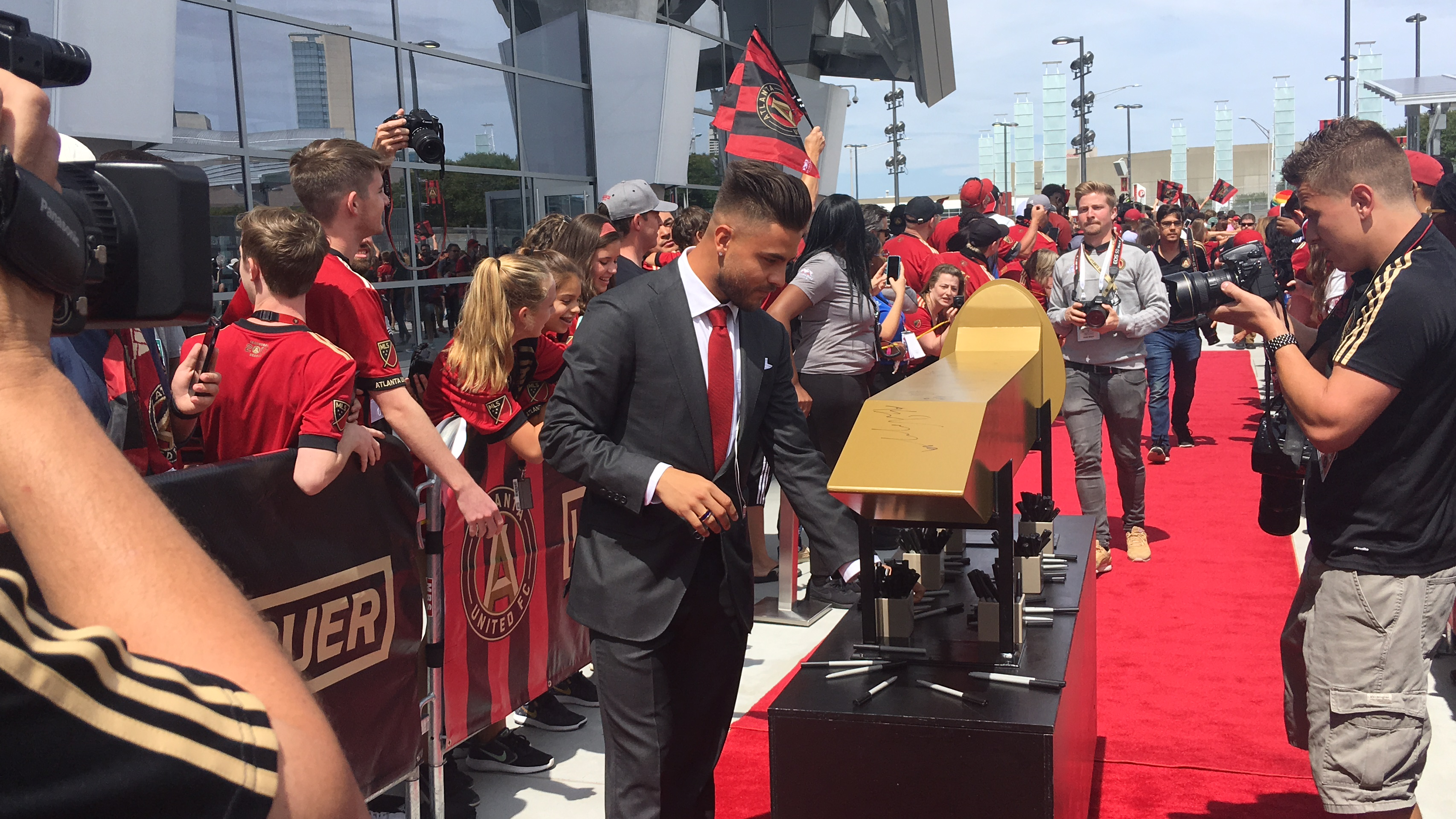
Tito Villalba signing the Golden Spike on 10 September 2017-09-10

On 22 July 2016, Villaba signed as a young Designated Player with Major League Soccer side Atlanta United. He joined Liga MX side Tijuana on loan on 28 July 2016, but struggled to make many appearances for the club due to injury.

On 31 January 2020, Villaba was transferred to Paraguayan Primera División side Club Libertad for US$4 million.

On 30 January 2025, Villalba was sold to Uruguayan Primera División side Peñarol for approximately US$1.8 million.

== International career ==
Born in Argentina, Héctor is also eligible to represent the Paraguay national team because his father was born there. On 5 September 2018, he made the one-time switch to Paraguay in hopes of making the squad for the 2019 Copa América and the 2022 FIFA World Cup.

On 25 September 2018, Villalba was called up to Paraguay along with fellow club teammate Miguel Almirón for a national team camp despite not scheduling any friendlies. He made his competitive debut with Paraguay on 20 November as a substitute in the second half of the friendly match against South Africa.

== Personal life ==
Villalba can speak Guarani, an indigenous language spoken in Paraguay.

In January 2018, Villalba earned a U.S. green card which qualifies him as a domestic player for MLS roster purposes.

== Career statistics ==
=== Club ===
As of match played on 7 October 2023

Appearances and goals by club, season and competition
Club	Season	League			National cup (Note: Includes Copa Argentina, Copa MX, and U.S. Open Cup.)		League cup (Note: Includes Torneos de Verano.)		Continental (Note: Includes Copa Libertadores, Copa Sudamericana, and CONCACAF Champions League.)		Other (Note: Includes FIFA Club World Cup, Supercopa Argentina, Recopa Sudamericana, MLS Cup Playoffs, and Trofeo Luigi Berlusconi.)		Total	
Club	Season	Division	Apps	Goals	Apps	Goals	Apps	Goals	Apps	Goals	Apps	Goals	Apps	Goals
San Lorenzo	2012–13	Argentine Primera División	9	2	3	0	—		—		—		12	2
San Lorenzo	2013–14	Argentine Primera División	34	4	1	0	—		2	0	—		37	4
San Lorenzo	2014	Argentine Primera División	15	3	0	0	—		13	1	1	0	29	4
San Lorenzo	2015	Argentine Primera División	27	6	2	0	—		5	0	1	0	35	6
San Lorenzo	2016	Argentine Primera División	4	0	0	0	2	0	2	0	—		8	0
San Lorenzo	Total		89	15	6	0	2	0	22	1	2	0	121	16
Tijuana (loan)	2016–17	Liga MX	1	0	2	0	—		—		—		3	0
Atlanta United	2017	Major League Soccer	34	13	0	0	—		—		1	0	35	13
Atlanta United	2018	Major League Soccer	28	7	1	0	—		—		5	1	34	8
Atlanta United	2019	Major League Soccer	20	1	1	0	—		4	0	2	0	27	1
Atlanta United	Total		82	21	2	0	—		4	0	8	1	96	22
Libertad	2020	Paraguayan Primera División	20	3	—		—		6	0	—		26	3
Libertad	2021	Paraguayan Primera División	20	5	—		—		14	2	—		34	7
Libertad	2022	Paraguayan Primera División	22	4	—		—		3	1	—		25	5
Libertad	2023	Paraguayan Primera División	29	13	—		—		10	0	—		39	13
Libertad	Total		91	25	—		—		33	3	—		124	28
Career total			263	61	10	0	2	0	59	4	10	1	344	66

=== International ===
As of 20 November 2018

Appearances and goals by national team and year
National team	Year	Apps	Goals
Paraguay	2018	1	0
Total		1	0

== Honours ==
San Lorenzo

- Argentine Primera División: 2013 Inicial
- Copa Libertadores: 2014
- Supercopa Argentina: 2015

Atlanta United

- MLS Cup: 2018
- Eastern Conference (playoffs): 2018
- U.S. Open Cup: 2019
- Campeones Cup: 2019

Libertad

- Paraguayan Primera División: 2021 Apertura, 2022 Apertura, 2023 Apertura, 2023 Clausura, 2024 Apertura
- Copa Paraguay: 2023, 2024
- Supercopa Paraguay: 2023

Peñarol

- Torneo Intermedio: 2025
- Copa AUF Uruguay: 2025

Individual

- MLS Goal of the Year: 2017
