= 2023 Huntsville City FC season =

Huntsville City FC
2023 season
- Owner: Nashville SC
- Head coach: Jack Collison
- Stadium: Joe Davis Stadium
- MLS Next Pro: Eastern Conference: 9th Overall: 17th
- Missed the Playoffs
- Top goalscorer: League: Azaad Liadi (12 goals); All: Azaad Liadi (12 goals)
- Highest home attendance: 5,605 (May 19) vs Crown Legacy
- Lowest home attendance: 3,480 (August 9) vs Columbus Crew 2
- Average home league attendance: 4,672
- Biggest win: Huntsville 6–2 Orlando City B (July 9)
- Biggest defeat: New England Revolution II 3–0 Huntsville (September 1)
Home colors	Away colors

The 2023 Huntsville City FC season was the inaugural season of Huntsville City FC, a soccer team based in Huntsville, Alabama, United States. It was their first season competing in MLS Next Pro, a professional developmental league in the third tier of the United States soccer pyramid. The club serves as a development and reserve squad for Nashville SC of Major League Soccer.

== Roster ==
As of August 12, 2023

No.	Pos.	Nation	Player
1	GK	USA	John Berner
2	DF	USA	Josh Bauer
3	DF	USA	Cyrus Rad
5	DF	USA	Sean Suber
6	MF	JAM	Joey DeZart
7	MF	ENG	Nicky Law
8	MF	CAN	Isaiah Johnston
9	FW	ENG	Shaun Joash
10	MF	ENG	Ollie Wright
11	FW	USA	Azaad Liadi
12	MF	USA	Danny Griffin
13	DF	USA	Joey Skinner
14	MF	USA	Isaiah Jones
15	DF	USA	Taylor Washington
16	FW	CRC	Randall Leal
17	MF	USA	Jonathan Bolanos
18	FW	FRA	Kemy Amiche
19	DF	USA	Josh Drack
20	FW	USA	Adem Sipic
21	DF	USA	Ahmed Longmire
23	DF	CAN	Chrisnovic N'sa
24	MF	SVK	Ján Greguš
25	DF	HAI	Fernando Ciceron
27	MF	CMR	Brian Anunga
28	FW	USA	Tyler Freeman
29	FW	USA	Nebiyou Perry
30	GK	USA	Elliot Panicco
31	FW	USA	Alejandro Velazquez-Lopez
33	GK	USA	Justin Cox
34	DF	USA	Alejandro Carrillo
35	DF	USA	Perrin Barnes
38	FW	USA	Eli Wachs
40	FW	USA	Lucas Wolthers
50	GK	USA	Jacob Grekowicz
65	MF	USA	Dominic Wilson
67	GK	USA	Ben Martino
88	MF	JAM	Christopher Pearson

Nashville SC first team player.
Signed to Nashville SC Academy contract.

== Transfers ==
=== In ===
Date	Position		Name	from	Type	Fee	Ref.
December 19, 2022	MF	8	(Canada) Isaiah Johnston	York United FC	signing	NA	
February 6, 2023	GK	1	(United States) John Berner	Memphis 901 FC	signing	NA	
February 6, 2023	DF	3	(United States) Cyrus Rad	Forward Madison FC	signing	NA	
February 6, 2023	MF	7	(England) Nicky Law	Tampa Bay Rowdies	signing	NA	
February 6, 2023	MF	10	(England) Ollie Wright	Rio Grande Valley FC	signing	NA	
February 6, 2023	FW	11	(United States) Azaad Liadi	Loudoun United	signing	NA	
February 6, 2023	MF	12	(United States) Danny Griffin	Pittsburgh Riverhounds SC	signing	NA	
February 6, 2023	MF	17	(United States) Jonathan Bolanos	Richmond Kickers	signing	NA	
February 6, 2023	DF	19	(United States) Josh Drack	LA Galaxy II	signing	NA	
February 6, 2023	DF	23	(Canada) Chrisnovic N'sa	York United	signing	NA	
February 6, 2023	DF	35	(United States) Perrin Barnes	Butler Bulldogs	signing	NA	
March 21, 2023	DF	5	(United States) Sean Suber	Charlotte 49ers	signing	NA	
March 21, 2023	MF	6	(Jamaica) Joey DeZart	Orlando City	signing	NA	
March 21, 2023	FW	9	(England) Shaun Joash	Grand Canyon Antelopes	signing	NA	
July 12, 2023	DF	25	(Haiti) Fernando Ciceron	Violette AC	signing	NA	
August 16, 2023	MF	88	(Jamaica) Christopher Pearson	FC Tulsa	Loan	NA	

=== Out ===
Date	Position	No.	Name	To	Type	Fee	Ref.
May 3, 2023	MF	12	Danny Griffin	Pittsburgh Riverhounds SC	Transferred	NA	
July 27, 2023	MF		(England) Nicky Law	(United States) Tampa Bay Rowdies	Mutually Parted ways	NA	

=== Staff ===
Coaching & Technical Staff
Director of Soccer Operations	(Isle of Man) Liam Doyle
Head coach	(Wales) Jack Collison
Assistant coach	(Palestine) Omar Jarun
Assistant coach	(England) Nicky Law
Goalkeeping coach	(United States) John Berner
Head Athletic Trainer	(United States) Luis Rodas
Performance Coach & Sports Scientist	(United States) Chris Romano
Video Analyst/Scouting	(Brazil) Matt Bautista
Head Equipment Manager	(United States) Sam Gibson

== Non-competitive fixtures ==
=== Preseason ===
The preseason schedule was announced on January 25, 2023.

February 11	Birmingham Legion FC	0–0	Huntsville City FC	Birmingham, Alabama
4:00 pm CT		Report		Stadium: Protective Stadium

February 14	Philadelphia Union II	1–1	Huntsville City FC	Bradenton, Florida
5:00 pm CT		Report		Stadium: IMG Academy; Attendance: B.C.D

February 22	Nashville SC	v	Huntsville City FC	Nashville, Tennessee
12:00 pm CT				Attendance: B.C.D

February 25	Chattanooga Red Wolves SC	2–2	Huntsville City FC	Chattanooga, Tennessee
1:00 pm CT	Paez; Trialist			Attendance: B.C.D

March 4	Huntsville City FC	2–0	Savannah Clovers FC	Huntsville, Alabama
3:30 pm CT				Stadium: John Hunt Park

March 14	Huntsville City FC	v	FC Cincinnati 2	Huntsville, Alabama
7:00 pm CT		Report		Stadium: John Hunt Park

March 18	Chattanooga FC	1–3	Huntsville City FC	Chattanooga, Tennessee
2:00 pm CT	Naglestad 63' (pen.)			Stadium: Finley Stadium

March 22	Alabama–Huntsville Chargers	v	Huntsville City FC	Huntsville, Alabama
6:00 pm CT				Stadium: Charger Park

== MLS Next Pro ==
=== Standings ===
==== Eastern Conference ====
Pos	Div	Team	Pld	W	SOW	SOL	L	GF	GA	GD	Pts	Qualification
1	NE	Crown Legacy FC	28	19	4	1	4	60	34	+26	66	Qualification for the Conference semifinals
2	NE	New England Revolution II	28	14	6	2	6	57	41	+16	56	Qualification for the Playoffs
3	CT	Columbus Crew 2	28	16	3	0	9	58	46	+12	54	Qualification for the Playoffs
4	NE	New York Red Bulls II	28	14	3	3	8	53	36	+17	51	Qualification for the Playoffs
5	CT	Orlando City B	28	13	2	3	10	59	61	−2	46	Qualification for the Playoffs
6	CT	Chicago Fire FC II	28	9	5	6	8	54	46	+8	43	Qualification for the Playoffs
7	NE	Philadelphia Union II	28	12	2	2	12	54	57	−3	42	Qualification for the Playoffs
8	NE	New York City FC II	28	12	1	3	12	60	55	+5	41	
9	CT	Huntsville City FC	28	9	4	3	12	48	45	+3	38	
10	CT	Atlanta United 2	28	9	2	4	13	50	52	−2	35	
11	NE	Toronto FC II	28	6	3	5	14	43	57	−14	29	
12	CT	FC Cincinnati 2	28	7	2	2	17	37	65	−28	27	
13	CT	Inter Miami CF II	28	5	1	5	17	34	68	−34	22	

Source: MLSNP Eastern Conference
Rules for classification: 1) points; 2) total wins; 3) total goal differential; 4) total goals scored; 5) fewer disciplinary points; 6) away goal differential; 7) away goals scored; 8) home goals differential; 9) home goals scored; 10) coin toss (2 clubs tied) or drawing of lots (≥3 clubs tied)

==== Overall table ====
Pos	Team	Pld	W	SOW	SOL	L	GF	GA	GD	Pts	Awards
1	Colorado Rapids 2	28	19	4	1	4	70	37	+33	66	Regular season champion and U.S. Open Cup First Round
2	Crown Legacy FC	28	19	4	1	4	60	34	+26	66	U.S. Open Cup First Round
3	Tacoma Defiance	28	14	6	3	5	57	36	+21	57	
4	New England Revolution II	28	14	6	2	6	57	41	+16	56	
5	Columbus Crew 2	28	16	3	0	9	58	46	+12	54	
6	New York Red Bulls II	28	14	3	3	8	53	36	+17	51	U.S. Open Cup First Round
7	Sporting Kansas City II	28	13	4	2	9	60	42	+18	49	U.S. Open Cup First Round
8	Austin FC II	28	12	4	5	7	40	23	+17	49	
9	St. Louis City 2	28	11	5	4	8	49	39	+10	47	
10	Orlando City B	28	13	2	3	10	59	61	−2	46	
11	San Jose Earthquakes II	28	11	5	2	10	41	36	+5	45	
12	Houston Dynamo 2	28	12	3	1	12	50	44	+6	43	
13	Minnesota United FC 2	28	10	5	3	10	50	52	−2	43	U.S. Open Cup First Round
14	Chicago Fire FC II	28	9	5	6	8	54	46	+8	43	U.S. Open Cup First Round
15	Philadelphia Union II	28	12	2	2	12	54	57	−3	42	
16	New York City FC II	28	12	1	3	12	60	55	+5	41	U.S. Open Cup First Round
17	Huntsville City FC	28	9	4	3	12	48	45	+3	38	
18	North Texas SC	28	9	1	7	11	43	45	−2	36	
19	Atlanta United 2	28	9	2	4	13	50	52	−2	35	
20	Portland Timbers 2	28	11	0	1	16	40	63	−23	34	U.S. Open Cup First Round
21	Whitecaps FC 2	28	8	3	4	13	36	49	−13	34	
22	Real Monarchs	28	8	2	3	15	27	54	−27	31	
23	Toronto FC II	28	6	3	5	14	43	57	−14	29	
24	FC Cincinnati 2	28	7	2	2	17	37	65	−28	27	
25	Los Angeles FC 2	28	6	0	7	15	30	39	−9	25	
26	LA Galaxy II	28	5	4	2	17	36	74	−38	25	U.S. Open Cup First Round
27	Inter Miami CF II	28	5	1	5	17	34	68	−34	22	

Source: MLSNP
Rules for classification: 1) points; 2) total wins; 3) total goal differential; 4) total goals scored; 5) fewer disciplinary points; 6) away goal differential; 7) away goals scored; 8) home goals differential; 9) home goals scored; 10) coin toss (2 clubs tied) or drawing of lots (≥3 clubs tied)

=== Match results ===
March 26 1	Crown Legacy FC	2–2 (3–4 SO)	Huntsville City FC	Matthews, North Carolina
2:00 PM CDT	Hegardt (yellow card) 10'; Bender (yellow card) 21'; Cambridge 28' (yellow card) 47'; Scardina 90+3'	Report	Bolanos (yellow card) 2'; Liadi 8', 72' (yellow card) 46'; Suber (yellow card) 14'; Sipic (yellow card) 89'; Johnston (yellow card) 90+2'	Stadium: Sportsplex at Matthews; Referee: Thomas Snyder
	Shootout
	Poreba (penalty scored); Romero (penalty scored); Armour (penalty missed); Thiago (penalty missed); Cambridge (penalty scored); Scardina (penalty missed)		(penalty scored) Skinner; (penalty scored) Rad; (penalty missed) Suber; (penalty scored) Johnston; (penalty missed) Wright; (penalty scored) Sipic

March 31 2	Orlando City B	2–1	Huntsville City FC	Kissimmee, Florida
6:00 PM CDT	Freeman 3', 43' (yellow card) 90'; Juninho (yellow card) 34'; Pérez (yellow card) 49'; Reid-Brown (yellow card) 79'; Mohammed (yellow card) 90+6'; Loyola (yellow card) 90+7'	Report	Griffin (yellow card) 54'; Skinner (yellow card) 58'; Amiche 62'; DeZart (yellow card) 90+1'	Stadium: Osceola County Stadium; Referee: Alyssa Nichols

April 9 3	FC Cincinnati 2	2–2 (6–7 SO)	Huntsville City FC	Highland Heights, Kentucky
4:00 PM CDT	Jimenez (yellow card) 50'; Ordóñez 59', 74'; Murphy (yellow card) 90+1'	Report	Wright 37'; Anunga (yellow card) 56'; Griffin 68'; Longmire (yellow card) 78'	Stadium: NKU Soccer Stadium; Referee: Nabil Bensalah
	Shootout
	Ordóñez (penalty scored); Castellano (penalty scored); Marshall (penalty scored); Mills (penalty scored); Turcios (penalty missed); Thomas (penalty scored); Akpunonu (penalty scored); Jimenez (penalty missed)		(penalty scored) Skinner; (penalty missed) Drack; (penalty scored) Dezart; (penalty scored) Griffin; (penalty scored) Bolanos; (penalty scored) Freeman; (penalty scored) Wright; (penalty scored) Suber

April 16 4	New York Red Bulls II	1–0	Huntsville City FC	Montclair, New Jersey
6:00 PM CDT	Ndam (yellow card) 14'; Gorday 45+1'; Salinas (yellow card) 45+4'	Report	Johnston (yellow card) 70'; N'sa (yellow card) 73'; sipic (yellow card) 81'	Stadium: MSU Soccer Park; Referee: Calin Radosav

April 23 5	Inter Miami CF II	4–3	Huntsville City FC	Fort Lauderdale, Florida
6:00 PM CDT	Cremaschi (yellow card) 14'; D’Agostini 38'; LaCava 40'; Allen (yellow card) 61'; Abadia-Reda 64'; Reyes 75' (pen.)	Report	Rad (yellow card) 17'; Bolanos 25' (yellow card) 30'; Joash 33'; Longmire (yellow card) 42'; Suber (yellow card) 89'; Amiche 90+4'	Stadium: DRV PNK Stadium; Referee: Jonathan Bilinski

May 5 6	Columbus Crew 2	1–0	Huntsville City FC	Columbus, Ohio
6:00 PM CDT	Micaletto 19'; Gannon (yellow card) 45+2'; Zengue (yellow card) 58'; Lapkes (yellow card) 90'	Report	Drack (yellow card) 51'	Stadium: Historic Crew Stadium; Referee: Luis Arroyo

May 12 7	Chicago Fire FC II	1–1 (1–4 SO)	Huntsville City FC	Bridgeview, Illinois
7:00 PM CDT	Osorio 56' (pen.)	Report	Liadi (yellow card) 26'; Johnston 45+3'	Stadium: SeatGeek Stadium; Referee: Rebecca Pagan
	Shootout
	Osorio (penalty scored); Orgel (penalty missed); Monis (penalty missed)		(penalty scored) Rad; (penalty scored) Freeman; (penalty scored) Dezart; (penalty scored) Johnston

May 19 8	Huntsville City FC	2–1	Crown Legacy FC	Huntsville, Alabama
7:00 PM CDT	Amiche (yellow card) 31'; Johnston (yellow card) 38'; Bolanos 42'; Freeman (yellow card) 69'; Liadi 70'	Report	Williams 4' (yellow card) 50'; Neeley (yellow card) 54'	Stadium: Joe Davis Stadium; Attendance: 5,605; Referee: Matthew Corrigan

May 26 9	Huntsville City FC	1–2	New York Red Bulls II	Huntsville, Alabama
7:00 PM CDT	N'sa 34'; Skinner (yellow card) 69'	Report 1 Report 2	Donkor 9'; Shapiro–Thompson (yellow card) 34'; Salinas (yellow card) 54'; Kasule 70' (pen.); Gutierrez (yellow card) 76'	Stadium: Joe Davis Stadium; Attendance: 5,168; Referee: Amin Hadzic

June 4 10	Huntsville City FC	3–4	NYCFC II	Huntsville, Alabama
6:00 PM CDT	Liadi 14'; Perry 16'; Joash (yellow card) 22' (goal) 35' (pen.); N'sa (yellow card) 39'; Bolanos (yellow card) 40'; Skinner (yellow card) 42'; Wright (red card) 72'; Johnston (yellow card) 77'	Report	Di Ponzio (yellow card) 25'; Arévalo 38'; Jiménez 50'; Myers 51', 71'; Hope-Gund (yellow card) 69'	Stadium: Joe Davis Stadium; Attendance: 4,512; Referee: Joshua Encarnación

June 11 11	Huntsville City FC	4–2	St. Louis City SC 2	Huntsville, Alabama
6:00 PM CDT	Bolanos 1'; Law (yellow card) 45+1'; Sipic 48'; Drack (yellow card) 56'; Amiche 65' (pen.), 68'	Match Report Report 2	Watts 13'; Kuzain 38'; Volmar (yellow card) 58'; Armstrong (yellow card) 65'	Stadium: Joe Davis Stadium; Attendance: 4,394; Referee: Anya Voigt

June 15 12	Toronto FC II	1–2	Huntsville City FC	North York, Toronto, Ontario
6:00 PM CDT	Gutiérrez (yellow card) 34'; Batiz 90+4'	Report	Suber (yellow card) 12'; Amiche 26'; Drack 64'; Joash (yellow card) 89'	Stadium: York Lions Stadium; Referee: Seyed-Mohammad Mohseni

June 18 13	Huntsville City FC	2–0	Inter Miami CF II	Huntsville, Alabama
6:00 PM CDT	Drack (yellow card) 36'; Joash 45+2'; Bolanos 63'; Higuain (yellow card) 64'; Collison (yellow card) 87'; Jarun (yellow card) 87'	Report 1 Report 2	Hall (yellow card) 10'; Perkovich (yellow card) 13'; Meek (yellow card) 64'; Basabe (yellow card) 86'; Ledesma (yellow card) 88'	Stadium: Joe Davis Stadium; Attendance: 4,979; Referee: Benjamin Meyer

June 25 14	Columbus Crew 2	1–0	Huntsville City FC	Columbus, Ohio
4:00 PM CDT	Williams (yellow card) 22'; Fuson (yellow card) 45'; Gannon 56'	Report	N'sa (yellow card) 51'; Johnston (yellow card) 85'	Stadium: Historic Crew Stadium; Referee: Alexandra Billeter

July 2 15	Huntsville City FC	0–0 (4–5 SO)	New England Revolution II	Huntsville, Alabama
6:00 PM CDT	N'sa (yellow card) 39'; Rad (yellow card) 50'	Report 1Report 2	Suárez (yellow card) 45+1'; Ítalo (yellow card) 59': Souza (yellow card) 72'	Stadium: Joe Davis Stadium; Attendance: 4,325; Referee: Katherine McCormick
	Shootout
	Skinner (penalty scored); Rad (penalty scored); Amiche (penalty scored); Suber (penalty missed); Joash (penalty scored)		(penalty scored) Dias; (penalty scored) Akanyirige; (penalty scored) Rozhansky; (penalty scored) Adebayo-Smith; (penalty scored) Bueno

July 9 16	Huntsville City FC	6–2	Orlando City B	Huntsville, Alabama
6:00 PM CDT	N'sa 19'; Wright (yellow card) 25'; Drack (yellow card) 27'; Johnston 32' (pen.), 35' (yellow card) 69'; Liadi (yellow card) 34' (goal) 51'; Amiche 55'; Skinner 78'	Report	Kibunguchy (yellow card) 2' (yellow-red card) 47'; Freeman 5'; Granados (yellow card) 22'; Lynn 65'	Stadium: Joe Davis Stadium; Attendance: 4,801; Referee: Gabriele Giusti

July 16 17	Huntsville City FC	1–2	Toronto FC II	Huntsville, Alabama
6:00 PM CDT	Liadi 29' (pen.); Drack (yellow card) 72'	Report	Batiz 37'; Stefanovic (yellow card) 63'; Adenuga 78'	Stadium: Joe Davis Stadium; Attendance: 5,505; Referee: Rebecca Pagan

July 23 18	Atlanta United 2	2–4	Huntsville City FC	Kennesaw, Georgia
6:30 PM CDT	Brennan 7'; Lanza (yellow card) 19'; Firmino 42' (yellow card) 79'; Twumasi (yellow card) 64'; Conway (yellow card) 72'	Report 1Report 2	Bolanos 23'; DeZart (yellow card) 60'; Liadi 73'; Perry 80'; Amiche 87'	Stadium: Fifth Third Bank Stadium; Referee: Adorae Monroy

July 30 19	NYCFC II	0–1	Huntsville City FC	Queens, New York City, New York
6:00 PM CDT	Benalcazar (yellow card) 41' (yellow-red card) 58'; Baiera (yellow card) 67'; Jiménez (yellow card) 88'	Report	Liadi 4' (yellow card) 26'; Perry (yellow card) 83'; N'sa (yellow card) 88'	Stadium: Belson Stadium; Referee: Amiel Aleman

August 6 20	Huntsville City FC	1–0	FC Cincinnati 2	Huntsville, Alabama
6:00 PM CDT	Perry 38'; Johnston (yellow card) 82'	Report	Adams (yellow card) 26'	Stadium: Joe Davis Stadium; Attendance: 4,172; Referee: DeShun Beard

August 9 21	Huntsville City FC	1–1 (4–5 SO)	Columbus Crew 2	Huntsville, Alabama
6:00 PM CDT	Adem Sipic 13'; Cicéron (yellow card) 28' (yellow-red card) 84'; Barnes (yellow card) 69'	Report	Micaletto (yellow card) 7'; Habroune 48'; Mrowka (yellow card) 90+1'	Stadium: Joe Davis Stadium; Attendance: 3,480; Referee: Wes Caouette
	Shootout
	Skinner (penalty scored); Johnston (penalty scored); Joash (penalty missed); Amiche (penalty scored); Liadi (penalty scored); Perry (penalty missed)		(penalty scored) Mohamed; (penalty scored) Habroune; (penalty scored) Fuson; (penalty missed) Gannon; (penalty scored) Mrowka; (penalty scored) Knight

August 13 22	Crown Legacy FC	1–0	Huntsville City FC	Matthews, North Carolina
11:00 AM CDT	Tavares 90+1'; Scardina (yellow card) 90+5'	Report	Wright (yellow card) 81'	Stadium: Sportsplex at Matthews; Referee: Tim Wagner

August 19 23	Huntsville City FC	5–2	Philadelphia Union II	Huntsville, Alabama
7:00 PM CDT	Liadi 35', 64', 73'; Amiche 42' (pen.); Drack (yellow card) 46'; Suber (yellow card) 49'; Skinner 89'	Report 1 Report 2	Olney 13'; Guennec (red card) 25'; Rick (yellow card) 41'; Pierre 48'; Olivas (yellow card) 49'; Sorenson (yellow card) 75'	Stadium: Joe Davis Stadium; Attendance: 4,590; Referee: Kevin Broadley

August 27 24	Huntsville City FC	2–2 (5–4 SO)	Inter Miami CF II	Huntsville, Alabama
6:00 PM CDT	Skinner 11', 65'		Hall 45+3'; Perkovich (yellow card) 50'; Johnson 87'	Stadium: Joe Davis Stadium; Attendance: 4,658; Referee: Muhammad Hassan
	Shootout
	Skinner (penalty missed); Amiche (penalty scored); Wright (penalty scored); DeZart (penalty scored); Sipic (penalty scored); Perry (penalty scored)		Johnson (penalty scored); Sessock (penalty scored); Meek (penalty scored); Valencia (penalty scored); Flores (penalty missed); Pymm (penalty missed)

September 1 25	New England Revolution II	3–0	Huntsville City FC	Foxborough, Massachusetts
6:00 PM CDT	Fry 8' (yellow card) 27'; Quinones (yellow card) 16'; Cicéron 47' (o.g.); Suarez (yellow card) 51'; Panayotou 71' (pen.); Rozhansky (yellow card) 73'; Escobar (yellow card) 80'; Leal (yellow card) 90+2'	Report	Johnston (yellow card) 3' (yellow-red card) 41'; Wright (yellow card) 31'; Liadi (yellow card) 45+2'	Stadium: Gillette Stadium; Referee: Ernie Constantine

September 10 26	Huntsville City FC	1–2	Atlanta United 2	Huntsville, Alabama
6:00 PM CDT	Wright (yellow card) 27'; Skinner (yellow card) 36' (goal) 45+1'; Suber (yellow card) 57'; Rad (yellow card) 82'; Liadi (yellow card) 89'	Report	Chol 49'; Conway (yellow card) 63' (goal) 90+6'; Tmimi (yellow card) 90+4'	Stadium: Joe Davis Stadium; Attendance: 4,604

September 17 27	Philadelphia Union II	2–1	Huntsville City FC	Chester, Pennsylvania
3:00 PM CDT	Rojas (yellow card) 23'; Pierre (yellow card) 36' (goal) 45'; Sorenseon (yellow card) 56'; Olney (red card) 61'; Vasquez (yellow card) 76'; Stojanovic 76'; Rick (yellow card) 88'	Report	Drack (yellow card) 32' (yellow-red card) 68'; Azaad Liadi 90+4' (pen.)	Stadium: Subaru Park; Referee: Jeremy Scheer

September 24 28	Huntsville City FC	2–2 (2–4 SO)	Chicago Fire FC II	Huntsville, Alabama
1:00 PM CDT	Perry 7'; Ciceron (yellow card) 13'; DeZart (yellow card) 33'; Bolanos 36'; Liadi (yellow card) 47'	Report 1 Report 2	Glasgow 10'; Ostrem (yellow card) 21'; Hency 25'; Leonard (yellow card) 55'; Mišković (yellow card) 90+6'	Stadium: Joe Davis Stadium; Attendance: 4,608; Referee: Adam Kilpatrick
	Shootout
	Bolanos (penalty scored); Wright (penalty scored); Velazquez-Lopez (penalty missed)		(penalty scored) Gallina; (penalty scored) Hency; (penalty scored) Reynolds; (penalty scored) Glasgow

== Statistics ==
=== Appearances and goals ===
No.	Pos	Nat	Player	Total		MLS Next Pro		MLSNP Playoffs	
No.	Pos	Nat	Player	Apps	Goals	Apps	Goals	Apps	Goals
1	GK	(United States) USA	John Berner	8	0	8+0	0	0+0	0
2	DF	(United States) USA	Josh Bauer	1	0	1+0	0	0+0	0
3	DF	(United States) USA	Cyrus Rad	19	0	15+4	0	0+0	0
4	MF	(England) ENG	Laurence Wyke	2	0	1+1	0	0+0	0
5	DF	(United States) USA	Sean Suber	26	0	26+0	0	0+0	0
6	MF	(Jamaica) JAM	Joey DeZart	23	0	19+4	0	0+0	0
7	MF	(England) ENG	Nicky Law	11	0	8+3	0	0+0	0
8	MF	(Canada) CAN	Isaiah Johnston	20	3	15+5	3	0+0	0
9	FW	(England) ENG	Shaun Joash	23	3	7+16	3	0+0	0
10	MF	(England) ENG	Ollie Wright	25	1	12+13	1	0+0	0
11	FW	(United States) USA	Azaad Liadi	22	12	18+4	12	0+0	0
12	MF	(United States) USA	Danny Griffin	5	1	4+1	1	0+0	0
13	DF	(United States) USA	Joey Skinner	27	5	21+6	5	0+0	0
14	MF	(Sierra Leone) SLE	Isaiah Jones	7	0	4+3	0	0+0	0
15	DF	(United States) USA	Taylor Washington	1	0	1+0	0	0+0	0
16	FW	(Costa Rica) CRC	Randall Leal	1	0	1+0	0	0+0	0
17	MF	(United States) USA	Jonathan Bolanos	23	6	20+3	6	0+0	0
18	FW	(France) FRA	Kemy Amiche	27	8	23+4	8	0+0	0
19	DF	(United States) USA	Josh Drack	24	1	19+5	1	0+0	0
20	DF	(United States) USA	Adem Sipic	22	2	7+15	2	0+0	0
21	DF	(United States) USA	Ahmed Longmire	11	0	8+3	0	0+0	0
22	FW	(United States) USA	Ethan Zubak	2	0	2+0	0	0+0	0
23	MF	(Canada) CAN	Chrisnovic N'sa	24	2	23+1	2	0+0	0
24	MF	(Slovenia) SVN	Ján Greguš	1	0	1+0	0	0+0	0
25	DF	(Haiti) HAI	Fernando Ciceron	8	0	8+0	0	0+0	0
27	MF	(Cameroon) CMR	Brian Anunga	1	0	1+0	0	0+0	0
28	FW	(United States) USA	Tyler Freeman	10	0	5+5	0	0+0	0
29	FW	(United States) USA	Nebiyou Perry	18	4	5+13	4	0+0	0
30	GK	(United States) USA	Elliot Panicco	5	0	5+0	0	0+0	0
31	FW	(United States) USA	Alejandro Velazquez-Lopez	1	0	0+1	0	0+0	0
33	GK	(United States) USA	Justin Cox	0	0	0+0	0	0+0	0
34	DF	(United States) USA	Alejandro Carrillo	0	0	0+0	0	0+0	0
35	DF	(United States) USA	Perrin Barnes	16	0	2+14	0	0+0	0
38	FW	(United States) USA	Eli Wachs	3	0	0+3	0	0+0	0
40	FW	(United States) USA	Lucas Wolthers	2	0	0+2	0	0+0	0
50	GK	(United States) USA	Jacob Grekowicz	0	0	0+0	0	0+0	0
65	MF	(United States) USA	Dominic Wilson	2	0	0+2	0	0+0	0
67	GK	(United States) USA	Ben Martino	15	0	15+0	0	0+0	0
88	MF	(Jamaica) JAM	Christpher Pearson	4	0	2+2	0	0+0	0

- Last updated: September 24, 2023
- Source: https://www.mlsnextpro.com/clubs/huntsville-city-fc/stats/#season=2023&competition=mls-next-pro&club=20223&statType=general&position=all

=== Top scorers ===
Rank	Position	Number	Name	MLS Next Pro	MLSNP Playoffs	Total
1	FW	12	(United States) Azaad Liadi	12	0	12
2	FW	18	(France) Kemy Amiche	8	0	8
3	MF	17	(United States) Jonathan Bolanos	6	0	6
4	DF	13	(United States) Joey Skinner	5	0	5
5	FW	29	(United States) Nebiyou Perry	4	0	4
6	MF	8	(Canada) Isaiah Johnston	3	0	3
6	FW	9	(England) Shaun Joash	3	0	3
8	DF	20	(United States) Adem Sipic	2	0	2
8	MF	23	(Canada) Chrisnovic N'sa	2	0	2
10	MF	12	(United States) Danny Griffin	1	0	1
10	MF	13	(England) Ollie Wright	1	0	1
10	MF	19	(United States) Josh Drack	1	0	1
Total				48	0	48

- Last updated: September 17, 2023
- Source: https://www.mlsnextpro.com/clubs/huntsville-city-fc/stats/#season=2023&competition=mls-next-pro&club=15140&statType=general&position=all

=== Top assists ===
Rank	Position	Number	Name	MLS Next Pro	MLSNP Playoffs	Total
1	MF	10	(England) Ollie Wright	6	0	6
1	FW	21	(France) Kemy Amiche	6	0	6
3	MF	17	(United States) Jonathan Bolanos	5	0	5
4	DF	13	(United States) Joey Skinner	3	0	3
4	MF	29	(United States) Nebiyou Perry	3	0	3
6
6	MF	7	(England) Nicky Law	2	0	2
6	MF	8	(Canada) Isaiah Johnston	2	0	2
6	FW	11	(United States) Azaad Liadi	2	0	2
6	FW	18	(United States) Josh Drack	2	0	2
10	DF	3	(United States) Cyrus Rad	1	0	1
10	DF	5	(United States) Sean Suber	1	0	1
10	MF	6	(United States) Joey DeZart	1	0	1
10	FW	9	(England) Shaun Joash	1	0	1
10	FW	16	(Costa Rica) Randall Leal	1	0	1
10	FW	28	(United States) Tyler Freeman	1	0	1
10	DF	35	(United States) Perrin Barnes	1	0	1
Total				38	0	38

- Last updated: September 24, 2023
- Source: https://www.mlsnextpro.com/clubs/huntsville-city-fc/stats/#season=2023&competition=mls-next-pro&club=20223&statType=general&position=all

=== Disciplinary record ===
No.	Pos.	Player	MLS Next Pro			MLSNP Playoffs			Total		
No.	Pos.	Player	Booked	(yellow card) (yellow-red card)	Sent off (straight red)	Booked	(yellow card) (yellow-red card)	Sent off (straight red)	Booked	(yellow card) (yellow-red card)	Sent off (straight red)
1	GK	(United States) John Berner	0	0	0	0	0	0	0	0	0
2	DF	(United States) Josh Bauer	0	0	0	0	0	0	0	0	0
3	DF	(United States) Cyrus Rad	3	0	0	0	0	0	3	0	0
5	DF	(United States) Sean Suber	5	0	0	0	0	0	5	0	0
6	MF	(Jamaica) Joey DeZart	3	0	0	0	0	0	3	0	0
7	MF	(England) Nicky Law	1	0	0	0	0	0	1	0	0
8	MF	(Canada) Isaiah Johnston	8	1	0	0	0	0	8	1	0
9	FW	(England) Shaun Joash	2	0	0	0	0	0	2	0	0
10	MF	(England) Ollie Wright	4	0	1	0	0	0	4	0	1
11	FW	(United States) Azaad Liadi	7	0	0	0	0	0	7	0	0
12	MF	(United States) Danny Griffin	1	0	0	0	0	0	1	0	0
13	DF	(United States) Joey Skinner	4	0	0	0	0	0	4	0	0
15	DF	(United States) Taylor Washington	0	0	0	0	0	0	0	0	0
16	FW	(Costa Rica) Randall Leal	0	0	0	0	0	0	0	0	0
17	MF	(United States) Jonathan Bolanos	3	0	0	0	0	0	3	0	0
18	FW	(France) Kemy Amiche	1	0	0	0	0	0	1	0	0
19	DF	(United States) Josh Drack	7	1	0	0	0	0	7	1	0
20	DF	(United States) Adem Sipic	3	0	0	0	0	0	3	0	0
21	DF	(United States) Ahmed Longmire	2	0	0	0	0	0	2	0	0
23	MF	(Canada) Chrisnovic N'sa	5	0	0	0	0	0	5	0	0
24	MF	(Slovenia) Ján Greguš	0	0	0	0	0	0	0	0	0
25	MF	(Haiti) Fernando Ciceron	2	1	0	0	0	0	2	1	0
27	MF	(Cameroon) Brian Anunga	1	0	0	0	0	0	1	0	0
28	FW	(United States) Tyler Freeman	1	0	0	0	0	0	1	0	0
29	FW	(United States) Nebiyou Perry	1	0	0	0	0	0	1	0	0
30	GK	(United States) Elliot Panicco	0	0	0	0	0	0	0	0	0
33	GK	(United States) Justin Cox	0	0	0	0	0	0	0	0	0
34	DF	(United States) Alejandro Carrillo	0	0	0	0	0	0	0	0	0
35	DF	(United States) Perrin Barnes	1	0	0	0	0	0	1	0	0
40	FW	(United States) Lucas Wolthers	0	0	0	0	0	0	0	0	0
50	GK	(United States) Jacob Grekowicz	0	0	0	0	0	0	0	0	0
67	GK	(United States) Ben Martino	0	0	0	0	0	0	0	0	0
88	MF	(Jamaica) Christopher Pearson	0	0	0	0	0	0	0	0	0
Total			66	3	1	0	0	0	66	3	4

- Last updated: September 24, 2023
- Source: https://www.mlsnextpro.com/clubs/huntsville-city-fc/stats/#season=2023&competition=mls-next-pro&club=20223&statType=general&position=all

== Awards and honors ==
=== MLS NEXT Pro Goal of the Matchday ===
Matchday	Player	Ref
1	(United States) Azaad Liadi	
3	(England) Ollie Wright	

=== MLS NEXT Pro Player of the Matchday ===
Week	Player	Reason	Ref
12	(France) Kemy Amiche	Two Goals and One Assist vs St. Louis City 2	
23	(United States) Azaad Liadi	Scored a Hat Trick vs Philadelphia Union II	

=== MLS NEXT Pro Team of the Matchday ===
Matchday	Ref
9	
16	

=== MLS NEXT Pro Coach of the Month ===
Month	Coach	Ref
August	(Wales) Jack Collison	
