= 2024 Huntsville City FC season =

Huntsville City FC
2024 season
- Owner: Nashville SC
- Head coach: Chris O'Neal
- Stadium: Joe Davis Stadium
- MLS Next Pro: Eastern Conference: 14th Overall: 27th
- MLSNext Pro Playoffs: Did not qualify
- Top goalscorer: League: Jonathan Bolanos, Woobens Pacius (8 goals); All: Jonathan Bolanos, Woobens Pacius (8 goals)
- Highest home attendance: 4,874 July 27 vs Atlanta United 2
- Lowest home attendance: 4,056 September 8 vs Inter Miami CF II
- Average home league attendance: 4,382
- Biggest win: Carolina Core FC 1–4 Huntsville City FC June 1, Atlanta United 2 3–6 Huntsville City September 15
- Biggest defeat: Orlando City B 5–0 Huntsville City May 26
Home colors	Away colors

The 2024 Huntsville City FC season was the second season of Huntsville City FC, a soccer team based in Huntsville, Alabama, United States. It was their second season competing in MLS Next Pro, a professional developmental league in the third tier of the United States soccer pyramid. The club serves as a development and reserve squad for Nashville SC of Major League Soccer.

== Players and Staff ==
=== Roster ===
As of August 10, 2024

No.	Pos.	Nation	Player
1	GK	USA	Simon Jillson
2	DF	USA	Christian Applewhite
3	DF	USA	Tomás Ritondale
4	MF	GHA	Patrick Amarh
5	DF	USA	Joel Sangwa
7	MF	USA	Brennan Creek
8	MF	CAN	Isaiah Johnston
9	FW	GHA	Forster Ajago
10	MF	ENG	Ollie Wright
12	DF	USA	Dominic Gasso (on loan from Detroit City FC)
13	DF	USA	Joey Skinner
14	DF	USA	Charly Dealmonte
15	DF	USA	Joey Akpunonu (on loan from FC Cincinnati)
16	MF	MEX	Jonathan Pérez
17	MF	USA	Jonathan Bolanos
18	MF	USA	Braxton Hayes
19	FW	USA	Cannon Stretchen
20	DF	USA	Nick DePuy
21	DF	FRA	Kessy Coulibaly
22	FW	USA	Maximus Ekk
23	MF	TRI	Dominic Wilson
24	MF	USA	Alejandro Velazquez-Lopez
25	DF	HAI	Fernando Cicéron
28	FW	HAI	Woobens Pacius
29	MF	USA	Julian Gaines
30	FW	CAN	Jordan Knight
31	GK	USA	Ammar Delic
32	MF	IRL	Ethan O'Brien (on loan from Indy Eleven)
35	DF	USA	Ashton Flowers
36	DF	USA	Scott Cheevers
38	MF	USA	Axel Picazo
39	GK	USA	Bryan Dowd (on loan from Chicago Fire FC)
40	MF	KEN	Faiz Opande
45	DF	USA	Owen Bland
46	FW	USA	Tristan Tropeano
47	MF	SLE	Isaiah Jones
49	GK	USA	Elliot Panicco
55	MF	USA	Jonathan Hernandez
56	DF	USA	Will Perkins (on loan from Union Omaha)
67	GK	USA	Ben Martino
77	MF	USA	Adem Sipić
78	MF	USA	Tyler Pasnik
99	GK	USA	Jacob Grekowicz

Nashville SC first team player.
Signed to Nashville SC Academy contract.

=== Staff ===
Coaching & Technical Staff
Director of Soccer Operations	(England) Matt Cairns
Head coach	(United States) Chris O'Neal
Assistant coach	(Palestine) Omar Jarun
Goalkeeping coach	Vacant
Head Athletic Trainer	(United States) Luis Rodas
Performance Coach & Sports Scientist	(United States) Josh Stewart
Video Analyst/Scouting	(Brazil) Matt Bautista
Head Equipment Manager	(United States) Sam Gibson

== Transfers ==
=== In ===
Date	Position	Number	Name	from	Type	Fee	Ref.
January 29, 2024	DF	21	(France) Kessy Coulibaly	(Czech Republic) MFK Vyskov	Signing	NA	
January 29, 2024	DF	3	(Argentina) Tomás Ritondale	(United States) Rio Grande Valley FC Toros	Signing	NA	
January 29, 2024	MF	4	(Ghana) Patrick Amarh	(Ghana) Inter Allies FC	Signing	NA	
January 29, 2024	MF	6	(Spain) Sergi Oriol	(Spain) UA Horta	Signing	NA	
January 29, 2024	FW	11	(El Salvador) Alexis Cerritos	(United States) Central Valley Fuego FC	Signing	NA	
January 29, 2024	FW	22	(United States) Maximus Ekk	(United States) Central Valley Fuego FC	Signing	NA	
March 6, 2024	GK	1	(United States) Simon Jillson	(United States) LA Galaxy II	Signing	NA	
March 12, 2024	DF	5	(United States) Joel Sangwa	(United States) Akron Zips	Signing	NA	
March 12, 2024	MF	7	(United States) Brennan Creek	(United States) Kentucky Wildcats	Signing	NA	
April 18, 2024	MF	40	(Kenya) Faiz Opande	(United Arab Emirates) Elite Falcons	Signing	NA	
May 17, 2024	FW	78	(Scotland) (United States) Tyler Pasnik	(Scotland) Rangers B	Signing	NA	
May 24, 2024	DF	20	(United States) Nick DePuy	(United States) Nashville SC	Signing	NA	
May 31, 2024	MF	32	(Republic of Ireland) Ethan O'Brien	(United States) Indy Eleven	Loan	NA	
June 8, 2024	MF	38	(United States) Axel Picazo	(United States) LA Galaxy II	Signing	NA	
June 8, 2024	DF	56	(United States) Will Perkins	(United States) Union Omaha	Loan	NA	
June 22, 2024	FW	30	(United States) Jordan Knight	(United States) Columbus Crew 2	Transfer	NA	
June 27, 2024	GK	39	(United States) Bryan Dowd	(United States) Chicago Fire FC	Loan	NA	
August 3, 2024	DF	12	(United States) Dominic Gasso	(United States) Detroit City FC	Loan	NA	
August 10, 2024	DF	15	(United States) Joey Akpunonu	(United States) FC Cincinnati	Loan	NA	
September 13, 2024	DF		(United States) Makel Rasheed	(United States) Xavier Musketeers	free agency signing	NA	

=== Out ===
Date	Position	No.	Name	To	Type	Fee	Ref.
July 27, 2023	MF	7	(England) Nicky Law	(United States) Tampa Bay Rowdies	Mutually Parted ways	NA	
December 7, 2023	DF	19	(United States) Josh Drack	(United States) Charleston Battery	Signing	NA	
December 21, 2023	GK	1	(United States) John Berner	(United States) Atlanta United 2	Signing	Free	
January 7, 2024	DF	23	(Canada) Chrisnovic N'sa	(Sweden) Ostersunds FK	Signing	Free	
January 19, 2024	DF	5	(United States) Sean Suber	(United States) Pittsburgh Riverhounds SC	Signing		
January 19, 2024	FW	11	(United States) Azaad Liadi	(United States) Lexington SC	Signing	NA	
February 28, 2024	MF	88	(Jamaica) Christopher Pearson	(United States) Columbus Crew 2	Loan Expired	Free	
March 8, 2024	MF	6	(Jamaica) Joey DeZart	(United States) Tampa Bay Rowdies	Signing	NA	
April 26, 2024	FW	11	(El Salvador) Alexis Cerritos	(United States) Lexington SC	Trade		
June 28, 2024	MF	8	(Canada) Isaiah Johnston	(United States) Loudoun United FC	Transfer	Undisclosed Sum	
September 13, 2024	MF	20	(United States) Nick DePuy	NA	Mutually Parted Ways	NA	

=== Loan out ===
Date	No.	Pos.	Player	Loaned to	Start	End	Source
May 29, 2024	20	MF	(United States) Nick DePuy	(United States) Memphis 901 FC	May 29, 2024	July 7, 2024	

== Non-competitive fixtures ==
=== Preseason ===
February 10	Huntsville City FC	v	Chattanooga Red Wolves SC	Huntsville, Alabama
2:00 PM CT				Stadium: Joe Davis Stadium

February 16	Huntsville City FC	3 – 1	University of Alabama in Huntsville	Huntsville, Alabama
7:00 PM CT				Stadium: Joe Davis Stadium

February 18	Huntsville City FC	v	South Georgia Tormenta FC	Huntsville, Alabama
2:15 PM CT				Stadium: Joe Davis Stadium

February 24	Huntsville City FC	1 - 2	Birmingham Legion FC	Huntsville, Alabama
2:00 PM CT				Stadium: Joe Davis Stadium; Attendance: Behind Closed Doors

March 1	Tampa Bay Rowdies	3 - 2	Huntsville City FC	Bradenton, Florida
6:00 PM CT	Cal Jennings 20'; Manuel Arteaga 64'; Leo Fernandes 90+2' (pen.)	Report	71' (pen.); 77' (pen.)	Stadium: IMG Academy; Attendance: Behind Closed Doors

March 8	Huntsville City FC	v	Atlanta United 2	Huntsville, Alabama
7:00 PM CT				Stadium: Joe Davis Stadium; Attendance: Behind Closed Doors

March 9	Huntsville City FC	Cancelled	Auburn University at Montgomery	Huntsville, Alabama
2:00 PM CT				Stadium: Loretta Spencer Soccer Complex

=== Friendlies ===
September 4	Huntsville City FC	0–2	Nashville SC	Huntsville, Alabama
7:00 PM CT			Pacius 52', 83'	Stadium: Joe Davis Stadium; Attendance: 3,500

== MLS Next Pro ==
=== Standings ===
==== Eastern Conference ====
Pos	Div	Team	Pld	W	SOW	SOL	L	GF	GA	GD	Pts	Qualification
1	NE	FC Cincinnati 2	28	16	2	2	8	47	34	+13	54	Qualification for the Playoffs
2	NE	Philadelphia Union II	28	15	3	1	9	59	41	+18	52	Qualification for the Playoffs
3	SE	Inter Miami CF II	28	14	0	6	8	53	45	+8	48	Qualification for the Playoffs
4	NE	Chicago Fire FC II	28	11	5	4	8	51	51	0	47	Qualification for the Playoffs
5	SE	Orlando City B	28	11	4	5	8	53	42	+11	46	Qualification for the Playoffs
6	NE	New York City FC II	28	11	3	6	8	58	46	+12	45	Qualification for the Playoffs
7	NE	Columbus Crew 2	28	11	4	4	9	53	47	+6	45	Qualification for the Playoffs
8	SE	Crown Legacy FC	28	11	5	2	10	51	46	+5	45	Qualification for the Playoffs
9	SE	Chattanooga FC	28	9	8	2	9	45	42	+3	45	
10	SE	Carolina Core FC	28	12	3	1	12	39	45	−6	43	
11	NE	New York Red Bulls II	28	10	4	2	12	56	61	−5	40	
12	NE	Toronto FC II	28	10	1	5	12	44	51	−7	37	
13	SE	Atlanta United 2	28	7	4	3	14	42	64	−22	32	
14	SE	Huntsville City FC	28	8	0	5	15	39	53	−14	29	
15	NE	New England Revolution II	28	4	4	2	18	37	59	−22	22	

Source: MLSNP Eastern Conference
Rules for classification: 1) points; 2) total wins; 3) total goal differential; 4) total goals scored; 5) fewer disciplinary points; 6) away goal differential; 7) away goals scored; 8) home goals differential; 9) home goals scored; 10) coin toss (2 clubs tied) or drawing of lots (≥3 clubs tied)

==== Overall table ====
Pos	Team	Pld	W	SOW	SOL	L	GF	GA	GD	Pts	Awards
1	North Texas SC	28	16	6	2	4	56	32	+24	62	Regular season champion
2	St. Louis City 2	28	17	1	3	7	53	35	+18	56	
3	FC Cincinnati 2	28	16	2	2	8	47	34	+13	54	
4	Philadelphia Union II	28	15	3	1	9	59	41	+18	52	
5	The Town FC	28	13	4	4	7	41	28	+13	51	
6	Inter Miami CF II	28	14	0	6	8	53	45	+8	48	
7	Chicago Fire FC II	28	11	5	4	8	51	51	0	47	
8	Tacoma Defiance	28	13	2	3	10	59	53	+6	46	
9	Orlando City B	28	11	4	5	8	53	42	+11	46	
10	Los Angeles FC 2	28	12	3	3	10	51	54	−3	45	
11	New York City FC II	28	11	3	6	8	58	46	+12	45	
12	Columbus Crew 2	28	11	4	4	9	53	47	+6	45	
13	Crown Legacy FC	28	11	5	2	10	51	46	+5	45	
14	Chattanooga FC	28	9	8	2	9	45	42	+3	45	
15	Carolina Core FC	28	12	3	1	12	39	45	−6	43	
16	Ventura County FC	28	8	8	3	9	49	49	0	43	
17	Whitecaps FC 2	28	10	3	4	11	45	44	+1	40	
18	New York Red Bulls II	28	10	4	2	12	56	61	−5	40	
19	Houston Dynamo 2	28	10	2	5	11	46	45	+1	39	
20	Real Monarchs	28	9	5	2	12	39	41	−2	39	
21	Sporting Kansas City II	28	10	2	4	12	53	57	−4	38	
22	Portland Timbers 2	28	8	4	6	10	43	45	−2	38	
23	Toronto FC II	28	10	1	5	12	44	51	−7	37	
24	Austin FC II	28	7	4	7	10	44	49	−5	36	
25	Minnesota United FC 2	28	8	4	0	16	43	73	−30	32	
26	Atlanta United 2	28	7	4	3	14	42	64	−22	32	
27	Huntsville City FC	28	8	0	5	15	39	53	−14	29	
28	Colorado Rapids 2	28	6	1	3	18	37	54	−17	23	
29	New England Revolution II	28	4	4	2	18	37	59	−22	22	

Source: MLSNP
Rules for classification: 1) points; 2) total wins; 3) total goal differential; 4) total goals scored; 5) fewer disciplinary points; 6) away goal differential; 7) away goals scored; 8) home goals differential; 9) home goals scored; 10) coin toss (2 clubs tied) or drawing of lots (≥3 clubs tied)

=== Match results ===
March 16 1	Chattanooga FC	2–2 (3–2 SO)	Huntsville City FC	Chattanooga, Tennessee
2:00 PM CDT	Gray 40'; McGrath 84' (pen.); Garvanian (yellow card) 90+2'; Jiménez (yellow card) 90+6'	Report 1 Report 2	Bolanos (yellow card) 35'; Sipic 47'; Wright 88'	Stadium: Finley Stadium; Attendance: 4,378; Referee: JC Griggs
	Shootout
	McGrath (penalty missed); Prepeliță (penalty scored); Pérez (penalty scored); Mina (penalty scored)		(penalty missed) Johnston; (penalty missed) Bolanos; (penalty scored) Ajago; (penalty scored) Ekk; (penalty missed) Wright

March 22 2	Huntsville City FC	1–1 (3–4 SO)	Orlando City B	Huntsville, Alabama
7:00 PM CDT	Sangwa 26'; Ajago (yellow card) 45+2'; Cheevers (yellow card) 59'; Sipić (yellow card) 64'; Wright (yellow card) 90'	Report 1 Report 2	Ellis 35' (yellow card) 65'; Tsukada (yellow card) 35'	Stadium: Joe Davis Stadium; Attendance: 4,072; Referee: Sergii Demianchuk
	Shootout
	Sipić (penalty missed); Cheevers (penalty scored); Johnston (penalty scored); Sangwa (penalty missed); Cerritos (penalty scored); Velazquez-Lopez (penalty missed)		(penalty missed) Kibunguchy; (penalty scored) Guske; (penalty scored) Tsukada; (penalty missed) Taifi; (penalty scored) Cocca; (penalty scored) Bowe

March 30 3	Huntsville City FC	3–4	Columbus Crew 2	Huntsville, Alabama
7:00 PM CDT	Bolanos (yellow card) 31' (goal) 38', 50' (pen.), 58'; Creek (yellow card) 49'; Coulibaly (red card) 90+6'	Report 1 Report 2	Rogers 8' (yellow card) 90+6'; Adu-Gyamfi 11'; González (yellow card) 49'; Pearson 56' (pen.); Saad 67'; Veycheck (yellow card) 90+1'	Stadium: Joe Davis Stadium; Attendance: 4,297; Referee: Alejo Calume

April 7 4	Inter Miami CF II	2–1	Huntsville City FC	Fort Lauderdale, Florida
1:00 PM CDT	Cremaschi (yellow card) 17'; Carmichael 24'; Destin 31'; Barton (yellow card) 77'		Cheevers 12'; Sipic (yellow card) 45+1' (yellow-red card) 70'; Cicéron (yellow card) 65'	Stadium: Chase Stadium; Referee: Alyssa Nichols

April 13 5	Huntsville City FC	1–1 (4–5 SO)	Crown Legacy FC	Huntsville, Alabama
7:00 PM CDT	Applewhite (yellow card) 30'; Jones (yellow card) 34'; Creek 69'; Cheevers (yellow card) 83'	Report 1	Nyandjo (yellow card) 30'; Mirkovic (yellow card) 30'; Duke (yellow card) 34' (yellow-red card) 36'; John 77'; Parrish (yellow card) 90+8'	Stadium: Joe Davis Stadium; Attendance: 4,400; Referee: Melinda Sopka
	Shootout
	Cerritos (penalty missed); Johnston (penalty scored); Cheevers (penalty scored); Creek (penalty scored); Bolanos (penalty scored)		(penalty scored) Boardman; (penalty scored) Mirkovic; (penalty scored) Parrish; (penalty scored) Bravo; (penalty scored) Berchimas

April 20 6	Huntsville City FC	0–1	Chattanooga FC	Huntsville, Alabama
7:00 PM CDT	Cicéron (yellow card) 43'; Cheevers (yellow card) 81'	Report	Viafara (yellow card) 37'; Prepeliță (yellow card) 61'; McGrath 86'	Stadium: Joe Davis Stadium; Attendance: 4,260; Referee: Luis Diego Arroyo

May 5 7	Philadelphia Union II	2–0	Huntsville City FC	Chester, Pennsylvania
2:00 PM CDT	Pierre (yellow card) 13'; Rojas (yellow card) 38'; Ngabo (yellow card) 71'; Vazquez (yellow card) 75'; Olney 79'; Westfield 89' (pen.)	Report	Johnston (yellow card) 64'	Stadium: Subaru Park; Referee: Velimir Stefanovic

May 10 8	Huntsville City FC	0–1	Toronto FC II	Huntsville, Alabama
7:00 PM CDT	Wright (yellow card) 41' (yellow-red card) 90+6'; Opande (yellow card) 90+2'	Report	Pearlman (yellow card) 73'; Sharp 85'	Stadium: Joe Davis Stadium; Attendance: 4,252; Referee: Kevin Fikar

May 18 9	Huntsville City FC	2–3	Atlanta United 2	Huntsville, Alabama
7:00 PM CDT	Cicéron (yellow card) 40'; Ritondale (yellow card) 58'; Ajago 67', 90' (yellow card) 90'; Bolanos (yellow card) 75'; Pasnik (yellow card) 90+3'	Report	Armas 30'; Gallardo (yellow card) 36'; Hadley 53'; Edwards (yellow card) 78'; Tmimi 88'	Stadium: Joe Davis Stadium; Attendance: 4,807; Referee: Aleksandar Zhelyazkov

May 26 10	Orlando City B	5–0	Huntsville City FC	Kissimmee, Florida
5:00 PM CDT	Solís 12'; Tsukada 48'; Cocca (yellow card) 63'; Mohammed 65'; Banguero 80', 90'	Report	Cicéron (yellow card) 24'; Sangwa (yellow card) 53'; Applewhite (yellow card) 58'; Jones (yellow card) 84'; DePuy (yellow card) 89'	Stadium: Osceola Heritage Park; Referee: Gerald Flores

June 1 11	Carolina Core FC	1–4	Huntsville City FC	High Point, North Carolina
7:00 PM CDT	Cuevas (yellow card) 45'; Aguas 50'; Covi (yellow card) 75'		Johnston (yellow card) 31'; Ajago 56'; Pasnik 64'; Sipic 90+1', 90+4'	Stadium: Truist Point; Attendance: 4,511; Referee: Rebecca Pagan

June 8 12	Huntsville City FC	4–2	Crown Legacy FC	Huntsville, Alabama
7:00 PM CDT	Ajago 3', 41' (yellow card) 45+3'; Ritondale (yellow card) 29'; Johnston (yellow card) 45+7'; Bolanos 74'; Pacius 84'	Report	Duke 45+2'; Sangoquiza (yellow card) 54' (goal) 57'; Ouedraogo (yellow card) 67'; Mayaka (yellow card) 90+5'	Stadium: Joe Davis Stadium; Attendance: 4,782; Referee: Anya Voigt

June 16 13	Huntsville City FC	0–4	Chicago Fire FC II	Huntsville, Alabama
6:00 PM CDT	Bolanos (yellow card) 44'; Skinner (yellow card) 60'		Tchétchao (yellow card) 39'; Poreba 45', 83'; Shannon (yellow card) 62'; Koffi 66'; Calle (yellow card) 81'; Wright (yellow card) 90+4'; Osorio 90+6' (pen.)	Stadium: Joe Davis Stadium; Attendance: 4,219; Referee: Abdou Ndiaye

June 23 14	FC Cincinnati 2	2–1	Huntsville City FC	Highland Heights, Kentucky
6:00 PM CDT	Santos 27'; Dem 70'; Schaefer (yellow card) 80'		Ajago (yellow card) 58' (goal) 81' (pen.); Cicéron (yellow card) 83'	Stadium: NKU Soccer Stadium; Referee: Joshua Encarnacion

June 28 15	Huntsville City FC	1–1 (5–6 SO)	Carolina Core FC	Huntsville, Alabama
7:00 PM CDT	Perkins (yellow card) 45'; Jones (yellow card) 63'; Knight 78'; Wright (yellow card) 83'; Velazquez-Lopez (yellow card) 90+6'		Covi (yellow card) 60'; Rodríguez 85'; Juarez (yellow card) 90+2'	Stadium: Joe Davis Stadium; Attendance: 4,211; Referee: Emmy Nonso-Anyakwo
	Shootout
	Ritondale (penalty missed); Perkins (penalty missed); Wright (penalty scored); Knight (penalty scored); O'Brien (penalty scored); Jones (penalty scored); Sangwa (penalty scored); Velazquez-Lopez (penalty missed)		(penalty scored) Sutton; (penalty scored) Diaz; (penalty missed) Subah; (penalty missed) Ndoye; (penalty scored) Canete; (penalty scored) Thomas; (penalty scored) Rodríguez; (penalty scored) Juarez

July 10 16	New England Revolution II	1–2	Huntsville City FC	Foxborough, Massachusetts
10:00 AM CDT	Leal 37'; Escobar (yellow card) 42'; McIntosh (yellow card) 50'; Monis (yellow card) 55'		Perkins (yellow card) 8'; Bolanos 33'; Pacius 47'; O'Brien (yellow card) 51' (yellow-red card)	Stadium: Gillette Stadium; Referee: Katherine McCormick

July 21 17	Inter Miami CF II	2–0	Huntsville City FC	Fort Lauderdale, Florida
5:00 PM CDT	Afonso (yellow card) 30' (goal) 76' (pen.); Sessock (yellow card) 35'; Negri (yellow card) 71'; Casas (yellow card) 82'; Carmichael 83' (pen.); Flores (yellow card) 90+1'		Skinner (yellow card) 7'; Jones (yellow card) 75'; Sangwa (yellow card) 82'; Wright (yellow card) 85'	Stadium: Chase Stadium; Referee: Anya Voigt

July 27 18	Huntsville City FC	1–2	Atlanta United 2	Huntsville, Alabama
7:00 PM CDT	Wright 75' (pen.)	Report	Wolff (yellow card) 16'; Neri 47', 50' (yellow card) 67'; Morales (yellow card) 71'	Stadium: Joe Davis Stadium; Attendance: 4,874; Referee: Muhammad Hassan

August 4 19	Crown Legacy FC	1–1 (4–3 p)	Huntsville City FC	Matthews, North Carolina
4:00 PM CDT	Smalls (yellow card) 59'; Neeley (yellow card) 75'; Tuiloma 90+8'		Bolanos (yellow card) 56'; O'Brien 72'; Perkins (yellow card) 90+1'; Skinner (yellow card) 90+6'	Stadium: Sportsplex at Matthews; Referee: Jalen Gray
	Penalties
	Nyandjo (penalty scored); Duke (penalty missed); Forbes (penalty scored); Reginaldo (penalty scored); Cambridge (penalty scored)		(penalty missed) Skinner; (penalty scored) Pasnik; (penalty scored) Pacius; (penalty scored) Perkins; (penalty missed) Bolanos

August 10 20	Huntsville City FC	1–0	Chattanooga FC	Huntsville, Alabama
7:00 PM CDT	Pérez 8'; Bolanos (yellow card) 32'; Jones (yellow card) 45+1'; Applewhite (yellow card) 64'; Knight (yellow card) 72'; Perkins (yellow card) 90+1'		Sosa (yellow card) 28'; Watson (yellow card) 69'	Stadium: Joe Davis Stadium; Attendance: 4,567; Referee: Johnathan Luk

August 17 21	Huntsville City FC	3–2	New York Red Bulls II	Huntsville, Alabama
7:00 PM CDT	Bolanos 9', 66' (yellow card) 90+2'; Pacius 32'; Jones (yellow card) 55'; Sangwa (red card) 80'; Gaines (yellow card) 90+3'		Ruiz (yellow card) 45+1'; Sekagya (yellow card) 45+1'; Hall 49'; Staff Member (yellow card) 54'; Mosquera 89'; Valencia (yellow card) 90+2'	Stadium: Joe Davis Stadium; Attendance: 4,170; Referee: Benjamin Meyer

August 25 22	Toronto FC II	2–3	Huntsville City FC	North York, Toronto, Ontario
2:00 PM CDT	Altobelli 16'; Fisher 45+1'; Pearlman (yellow card) 56'; Stojadinovic (yellow card) 76'		Sipic 2'; Pacius 51'; Tropeano 82'; Akpunonu (yellow card) 89'	Stadium: York Lions Stadium; Referee: Youcef Boumsied

September 1 23	Orlando City B	2–1	Huntsville City FC	Kissimmee, Florida
6:00 PM CDT	Petrasso (yellow card) 4'; Almaguer 29'; Rivera (yellow card) 44'; Guske (yellow card) 49'; Freeman 66' (pen.)		Gasso (yellow card) 41'; Bolanos (yellow card) 42'; Knight (yellow card) 65'; Gaines 81'; Jillson (yellow card) 90+5'	Stadium: Osceola Heritage Park; Referee: Alexandra Billeter

September 8 24	Huntsville City FC	0–2	Inter Miami CF II	Huntsville, Alabama
6:00 PM CDT	Knight (yellow card) 37' (yellow-red card) 73'	Report	Basabe (yellow card) 5'; Flores 10'; Casas (yellow card) 54'; Carmichael 71'	Stadium: Joe Davis Stadium; Attendance: 4,056; Referee: Alejo Calume

September 15 25	Atlanta United 2	3–6	Huntsville City FC	Kennesaw, Georgia
2:00 PM CDT	Morales (yellow card) 33'; Okello 44'; Tmimi 49'; Carleton (yellow card) 57'; Gordon 81'		Pacius 12', 37', 88' (pen.) (yellow card) 53'; Ajago 22'; Skinner (yellow card) 34'; Bolanos 35' (yellow card) 66'; Gaines (yellow card) 78'; Pérez 85'	Stadium: Fifth Third Bank Stadium; Referee: Promise Adebayo-Ige

September 22 26	Huntsville City FC	0–2	FC Cincinnati 2	Huntsville, Alabama
6:00 PM CDT	Perkins (yellow card) 6'; Gasso (yellow card) 51'; Pacius (yellow card) 61'	Report	Schaefer 15'; Tablante (yellow card) 29'; Daley (yellow card) 47'; Walters (yellow card) 86'; Ramos 89'	Stadium: Joe Davis Stadium; Attendance: 4,381; Referee: John Matto

September 29 27	Carolina Core FC	2–0	Huntsville City FC	High Point, North Carolina
4:00 PM CDT	Rodríguez 14'; Thomas (yellow card) 28'; Covi 56' (pen.)	Report	Jones (yellow card) 54'; O'Brien (yellow card) 55'; Wright (yellow card) 64'; Jonathan Bolanos (yellow card) 74'	Stadium: Truist Point; Attendance: 4,106; Referee: Josiah Parke

October 6 28	New York City FC II	0–1	Huntsville City FC	Queens, New York City, New York
12:00 PM CDT	Hope-Gund (yellow card) 66'; Owusu (yellow card) 74'		Pacius 32'; Bolanos (yellow card) 38'; Akpunonu (yellow card) 63'; Skinner (yellow card) 69'; Wright (yellow card) 83'	Stadium: Belson Stadium; Referee: Emmy Nonso

=== Appearances and goals ===
No.	Pos	Nat	Player	Total		MLS Next Pro		MLSNP Playoffs	
No.	Pos	Nat	Player	Apps	Goals	Apps	Goals	Apps	Goals
1	GK	(United States) USA	Simon Jillson	2	0	2+0	0	0+0	0
2	DF	(United States) USA	Christian Applewhite	20	0	18+2	0	0+0	0
3	DF	(Argentina) ARG	Tomás Ritondale	13	0	6+7	0	0+0	0
4	MF	(Ghana) GHA	Patrick Amarh	0	0	0+0	0	0+0	0
5	DF	(United States) USA	Joel Sangwa	21	1	12+9	1	0+0	0
6	DF	(Spain) ESP	Sergi Oriol	6	0	3+3	0	0+0	0
7	MF	(United States) USA	Brennan Creek	8	1	6+2	1	0+0	0
8	MF	(Canada) CAN	Isaiah Johnston	13	0	12+1	0	0+0	0
9	FW	(Ghana) GHA	Forster Ajago	12	7	11+1	7	0+0	0
10	MF	(England) ENG	Ollie Wright	26	2	15+11	2	0+0	0
11	FW	(El Salvador) SLV	Alexis Cerritos	4	0	0+4	0	0+0	0
12	DF	(United States) USA	Dominic Gasso	9	0	5+4	0	0+0	0
13	DF	(United States) USA	Joey Skinner	14	0	9+5	0	0+0	0
14	DF	(United States) USA	Charly Dealmonte	0	0	0+0	0	0+0	0
15	DF	(United States) USA	Joey Akpunonu	7	0	7+0	0	0+0	0
16	MF	(Mexico) MEX	Jonathan Pérez	3	2	2+1	2	0+0	0
17	MF	(United States) USA	Jonathan Bolanos	26	8	25+1	8	0+0	0
18	MF	(United States) USA	Braxton Hayes	1	0	0+1	0	0+0	0
19	FW	(United States) USA	Cannon Stretchen	6	0	2+4	0	0+0	0
20	DF	(United States) USA	Nick DePuy	4	0	3+1	0	0+0	0
21	DF	(France) FRA	Kessy Coulibaly	3	0	0+3	0	0+0	0
22	FW	(United States) USA	Maximus Ekk	7	0	6+1	0	0+0	0
23	MF	(Trinidad and Tobago) TRI	Dominic Wilson	6	0	3+3	0	0+0	0
24	FW	(United States) USA	Alejandro Velazquez-Lopez	9	0	4+5	0	0+0	0
25	DF	(Haiti) HAI	Fernando Ciceron	18	0	16+2	0	0+0	0
27	DF	(Australia) AUS	Patrick Yazbek	1	0	0+1	0	0+0	0
28	FW	(Haiti) HAI	Woobens Pacius	16	7	13+3	7	0+0	0
29	MF	(United States) USA	Julian Gaines	6	1	4+2	1	0+0	0
30	FW	(Canada) CAN	Jordan Knight	10	1	6+4	1	0+0	0
31	GK	(United States) USA	Ammar Delic	0	0	0+0	0	0+0	0
32	MF	(Republic of Ireland) IRL	Ethan O'Brien	14	1	12+2	1	0+0	0
33	MF	(United States) USA	Omar Bolanos	1	0	1+0	0	0+0	0
35	DF	(United States) USA	Ashton Flowers	0	0	0+0	0	0+0	0
36	DF	(United States) USA	Scott Cheevers	7	1	5+2	1	0+0	0
38	MF	(United States) USA	Axel Picazo	10	0	8+2	0	0+0	0
39	GK	(United States) USA	Bryan Dowd	7	0	7+0	0	0+0	0
40	MF	(Kenya) KEN	Faiz Opande	19	0	15+4	0	0+0	0
45	DF	(United States) USA	Owen Bland	0	0	0+0	0	0+0	0
46	FW	(United States) USA	Tristan Tropeano	3	1	0+3	1	0+0	0
47	MF	(Sierra Leone) SLE	Isaiah Jones	23	0	17+6	0	0+0	0
49	GK	(United States) USA	Elliot Panicco	2	0	2+0	0	0+0	0
54	MF	(United States) USA	Sean Davis	1	0	1+0	0	0+0	0
55	MF	(United States) USA	Jonathan Hernandez	0	0	0+0	0	0+0	0
56	DF	(United States) USA	Will Perkins	16	0	11+5	0	0+0	0
65	FW	(Costa Rica) CRC	Randall Leal	1	0	0+1	0	0+0	0
67	GK	(United States) USA	Ben Martino	14	0	14+0	0	0+0	0
75	MF	(England) ENG	Dru Yearwood	1	0	1+0	0	0+0	0
77	MF	(United States) USA	Adem Sipić	19	4	10+9	4	0+0	0
78	FW	(Scotland) SCO	Tyler Pasnik	10	1	3+7	1	0+0	0
99	GK	(United States) USA	Jacob Grekowicz	2	0	2+0	0	0+0	0

- Last updated: September 29, 2024
- Source: https://www.mlsnextpro.com/clubs/huntsville-city-fc/stats/#season=2024&competition=mls-next-pro&club=20223&statType=general&position=all

=== Top scorers ===
Rank	Position	Number	Name	MLS Next Pro	MLSNP Playoffs	Total
1	MF	17	(United States) Jonathan Bolanos	8	0	8
1	FW	28	(Haiti) Woobens Pacius	8	0	8
3	FW	9	(Ghana) Forster Ajago	7	0	7
4	MF	77	(United States) Adem Sipic	4	0	4
5	MF	10	(England) Ollie Wright	2	0	2
5	MF	16	(Mexico) Jonathan Pérez	2	0	2
7	DF	5	(United States) Joel Sangwa	1	0	1
7	MF	7	(United States) Brennan Creek	1	0	1
7	FW	29	(United States) Julian Gaines	1	0	1
7	FW	30	(Canada) Jordan Knight	1	0	1
7	MF	32	(Republic of Ireland) Ethan O'Brien	1	0	1
7	DF	36	(United States) Scott Cheevers	1	0	1
7	FW	46	(United States) Tristan Tropeano	1	0	1
7	FW	78	(Scotland) Tyler Pasnik	1	0	1
Total				39	0	39

- Last updated: October 6, 2024
- Source: https://www.mlsnextpro.com/clubs/huntsville-city-fc/stats/#season=2024&competition=mls-next-pro&club=20223&statType=general&position=all

=== Top assists ===
Rank	Position	Number	Name	MLS Next Pro	MLSNP Playoffs	Total
1	MF	17	(United States) Jonathan Bolanos	7	0	7
2	DF	10	(England) Ollie Wright	4	0	4
3	FW	9	(Ghana) Forster Ajago	3	0	3
4	MF	7	(United States) Brennan Creek	2	0	2
4	FW	28	(Haiti) Woobens Pacius	2	0	2
4	DF	38	(United States) Axel Picazo	2	0	2
4	DF	56	(United States) Will Perkins	2	0	2
8	DF	2	(United States) Christian Applewhite	1	0	1
8	DF	5	(United States) Joel Sangwa	1	0	1
8	DF	13	(United States) Dominic Gasso	1	0	1
8	DF	15	(United States) Joey Akpunonu	1	0	1
8	FW	22	(United States) Maximus Ekk	1	0	1
8	FW	24	(United States) Alejandro Velazquez-Lopez	1	0	1
8	DF	77	(United States) Adem Sipic	1	0	1
8	FW	78	(Scotland) Tyler Pasnik	1	0	1
Total				31	0	31

- Last updated: October 6, 2024
- Source: https://www.mlsnextpro.com/clubs/huntsville-city-fc/stats/#season=2024&competition=mls-next-pro&club=20223&statType=general&position=all

=== Disciplinary record ===
No.	Pos.	Player	MLS Next Pro			MLSNP Playoffs			Total		
No.	Pos.	Player	Booked	(yellow card) (yellow-red card)	Sent off (straight red)	Booked	(yellow card) (yellow-red card)	Sent off (straight red)	Booked	(yellow card) (yellow-red card)	Sent off (straight red)
1	GK	(United States) Simon Jillson	1	0	0	0	0	0	1	0	0
2	DF	(United States) Christian Applewhite	3	0	0	0	0	0	3	0	0
3	DF	(Argentina) Tomás Ritondale	2	0	0	0	0	0	2	0	0
4	MF	(Ghana) Patrick Amarh	0	0	0	0	0	0	0	0	0
5	DF	(United States) Joel Sangwa	2	0	1	0	0	0	2	0	1
6	MF	(Spain) Sergi Oriol	0	0	0	0	0	0	0	0	0
7	MF	(United States) Brennan Creek	1	0	0	0	0	0	1	0	0
8	MF	(Canada) Isaiah Johnston	3	0	0	0	0	0	3	0	0
9	FW	(Ghana) Forster Ajago	4	0	0	0	0	0	4	0	0
10	MF	(England) Ollie Wright	7	1	0	0	0	0	7	1	0
11	FW	(El Salvador) Alexis Cerritos	0	0	0	0	0	0	0	0	0
12	DF	(United States) Dominic Gasso	2	0	0	0	0	0	2	0	0
13	DF	(United States) Joey Skinner	5	0	0	0	0	0	5	0	0
14	DF	(United States) Charly Dealmonte	0	0	0	0	0	0	0	0	0
15	DF	(United States) Joey Akpunonu	2	0	0	0	0	0	2	0	0
16	MF	(Mexico) Jonathan Pérez	0	0	0	0	0	0	0	0	0
17	MF	(United States) Jonathan Bolanos	10	0	0	0	0	0	10	0	0
18	MF	(United States) Braxton Hayes	0	0	0	0	0	0	0	0	0
19	FW	(United States) Cannon Stretchen	0	0	0	0	0	0	0	0	0
20	MF	(United States) Nick DePuy	1	0	0	0	0	0	1	0	0
21	DF	(France) Kessy Coulibaly	0	0	1	0	0	0	0	0	1
22	FW	(United States) Maximus Ekk	0	0	0	0	0	0	0	0	0
23	MF	(Trinidad and Tobago) Dominic Wilson	0	0	0	0	0	0	0	0	0
24	MF	(United States) Alejandro Velazquez-Lopez	1	0	0	0	0	0	1	0	0
25	DF	(Haiti) Fernando Ciceron	5	0	0	0	0	0	5	0	0
27	DF	(Australia) Patrick Yazbek	0	0	0	0	0	0	0	0	0
28	DF	(Haiti) Woobens Pacius	2	0	0	0	0	0	2	0	0
29	MF	(United States) Julian Gaines	2	0	0	0	0	0	2	0	0
30	MF	(Canada) Jordan Knight	3	1	0	0	0	0	3	1	0
32	MF	(Republic of Ireland) Ethan O'Brien	2	1	0	0	0	0	2	1	0
33	MF	(United States) Omar Bolanos	1	0	0	0	0	0	1	0	0
35	DF	(United States) Ashton Flowers	0	0	0	0	0	0	0	0	0
36	DF	(United States) Scott Cheevers	3	0	0	0	0	0	3	0	0
38	MF	(United States) Axel Picazo	0	0	0	0	0	0	0	0	0
39	GK	(United States) Bryan Dowd	0	0	0	0	0	0	0	0	0
40	MF	(Kenya) Faiz Opande	1	0	0	0	0	0	1	0	0
45	DF	(United States) Owen Bland	0	0	0	0	0	0	0	0	0
46	FW	(United States) Tristan Tropeano	0	0	0	0	0	0	0	0	0
47	MF	(Sierra Leone) Isaiah Jones	7	0	0	0	0	0	7	0	0
49	GK	(United States) Elliot Panicco	0	0	0	0	0	0	0	0	0
54	MF	(United States) Sean Davis	0	0	0	0	0	0	0	0	0
55	MF	(United States) Jonathan Hernandez	0	0	0	0	0	0	0	0	0
56	DF	(United States) Will Perkins	5	0	0	0	0	0	5	0	0
67	GK	(United States) Ben Martino	0	0	0	0	0	0	0	0	0
77	DF	(United States) Adem Sipic	2	1	0	0	0	0	2	1	0
78	FW	(Scotland) Tyler Pasnik	1	0	0	0	0	0	1	0	0
99	GK	(United States) Jacob Grekowicz	0	0	0	0	0	0	0	0	0
Total			78	4	2	0	0	0	78	4	2

- Last updated: October 6, 2024
- Source: https://www.mlsnextpro.com/clubs/huntsville-city-fc/stats/#season=2024&competition=mls-next-pro&club=20223&statType=general&position=all

== Awards and honors ==
=== MLS NEXT Pro Player of the Matchweek ===
Week	Player	Ref
13	(United States) Jonathan Bolanos	
27	(Canada) Woobens Pacius	

=== MLS NEXT Pro Rising Star of Matchweek ===
Week	Player	Ref
24	(United States) Tristan Tropeano	
