= 2023 Nashville SC season =

Nashville SC
2023 season
- General manager: Mike Jacobs
- Head coach: Gary Smith
- Stadium: Geodis Park
- MLS: Conference: 7th Overall: 12th
- MLS Cup Playoffs: First round
- U.S. Open Cup: Round of 16
- Leagues Cup: Runners-up
- Top goalscorer: League: Hany Mukhtar (15); All: Hany Mukhtar (17)
- Average home league attendance: 28,257
Home colors	Away colors

The 2023 Nashville SC season was the fourth season for Nashville SC as a member of Major League Soccer (MLS), the top flight of professional soccer in the United States. After finishing the 2022 season with a playoff berth and a first round exit, the club loaned out Designated Player and forward Aké Arnaud Loba to Mazatlán F.C. and made trades to add depth. Midfielder Hany Mukhtar had finished the previous season as the league's top goalscorer, earning the MLS Golden Boot with 23 goals, and was also won the most valuable player award.

The club moved from the Western Conference to the Eastern Conference for the 2023 season and played 34 regular season matches between February 25 and October 21. The team opened their preseason training camp on January 9 in Tampa, Florida, and played several friendly matches in Florida. Nashville SC also participated in the Leagues Cup, a knockout competition for all MLS and Liga MX clubs in July and August. They finished as runners-up, hosting the Leagues Cup final against Inter Miami CF and losing in a penalty shootout. The club entered the U.S. Open Cup in the third round and advanced to the Round of 16, where they were eliminated by Miami.

Nashville qualified for the MLS Cup Playoffs—their fourth consecutive postseason—by finishing seventh in the Eastern Conference. They were eliminated in the first round by Orlando City SC, losing the first two games in the best-of-three series by a 1–0 scoreline.

== Non-competitive matches ==
=== Preseason ===
During the preseason, Nashville SC had a 3–2–1 record.

January 21	Nashville SC	0–1	New York Red Bulls	Bradenton, Florida
		Report	Cásseres Jr.	Stadium: IMG Academy

January 24	Nashville SC	2–1	United States U-20	Tampa, Florida
	Picault; Sapong	Report

January 30	Nashville SC	0–0	Louisville City FC	Nashville, Tennessee
6:30 p.m. CST		Report		Stadium: Geodis Park

February 7	Nashville SC	NP	Orlando City SC	Tampa, Florida
Note: Canceled due to venue availability issues.

February 10	New England Revolution	1–0	Nashville SC	Tampa, Florida
12:00 p.m. CST	Borrero 50'	Report		Stadium: Al Lang Stadium

February 14	Nashville SC	2–0 (a.e.t.)	Philadelphia Union	St. Petersburg, Florida
	Bunbury	Report		Attendance: Closed doors

February 17	Nashville SC	6–3	FC Cincinnati	Tampa, Florida
11:00 a.m. CST	Leal 6'; Shaffelburg 21'; 28'; Muyl 95', 98'; 118'	Report	Santos 34', 49'; Acosta 65' (pen.)	Stadium: Al Lang Stadium

== Competitive ==
=== Major League Soccer ===
==== Standings ====
MLS Eastern Conference table (2023)
Pos	Team	Pld	W	L	T	GF	GA	GD	Pts	Qualification
5	New England Revolution	34	15	9	10	58	46	+12	55	MLS Cup Round One
6	Atlanta United FC	34	13	9	12	66	53	+13	51	MLS Cup Round One
7	Nashville SC	34	13	11	10	39	32	+7	49	MLS Cup Round One
8	New York Red Bulls	34	11	13	10	36	39	−3	43	MLS Cup Wild Card
9	Charlotte FC	34	10	11	13	45	52	−7	43	MLS Cup Wild Card

Source: MLS
Rules for classification: 1) points; 2) total wins; 3) total goal differential; 4) total goals scored; 5) fewer disciplinary points; 6) away goal differential; 7) away goals scored; 8) home goals differential; 9) home goals scored; 10) coin toss (2 clubs tied) or drawing of lots (≥3 clubs tied)

Overall MLS standings table
Pos	Team	Pld	W	L	T	GF	GA	GD	Pts	Qualification
10	Atlanta United FC	34	13	9	12	66	53	+13	51	
11	Real Salt Lake	34	14	12	8	48	50	−2	50	
12	Nashville SC	34	13	11	10	39	32	+7	49	CONCACAF Champions Cup
13	Vancouver Whitecaps FC	34	12	10	12	55	48	+7	48	CONCACAF Champions Cup
14	FC Dallas	34	11	10	13	41	37	+4	46	

Source: MLS
Rules for classification: 1) points; 2) total wins; 3) total goal differential; 4) total goals scored; 5) fewer disciplinary points; 6) away goal differential; 7) away goals scored; 8) home goals differential; 9) home goals scored; 10) coin toss (2 clubs tied) or drawing of lots (≥3 clubs tied)

==== Match results ====
February 25 MLS 1	Nashville SC	2–0	New York City FC	Nashville, Tennessee
3:30 p.m. CST	Zimmerman 34'; Shaffelburg (yellow card) 58', (goal) 80'	Report	Cufré (yellow card) 28'; Talles Magno (yellow card) 62'; Thiago Andrade (yellow card) 75'; Chanot (yellow card) 90+3'	Stadium: Geodis Park; Attendance: 28,051; Referee: Armando Villarreal

March 4 MLS 2	New York Red Bulls	0–0	Nashville SC	Harrison, New Jersey
6:30 p.m. CST		Report	McCarty (yellow card) 3'; Anunga (yellow card) 52'; Zimmerman (yellow card) 85'; Washington (yellow card) 90+3'	Stadium: Red Bull Arena; Attendance: 18,474; Referee: Pierre-Luc Lauziere

March 11 MLS 3	Nashville SC	2–0	CF Montréal	Nashville, Tennessee
7:30 p.m. CST	Shaffelburg 37'; Washington (yellow card) 67', (goal) 89'	Report	Wanyama (yellow card) 34'	Stadium: Geodis Park; Attendance: 25,958; Referee: Rubiel Vazquez

March 18 MLS 4	New England Revolution	1–0	Nashville SC	Foxborough, Massachusetts
6:30 p.m. CDT	Bou 52'; Polster (yellow card) 70'	Report	Muyl (yellow card) 21'; Maher (yellow card) 73'	Stadium: Gillette Stadium; Attendance: 14,930; Referee: Jon Freemon

March 25 MLS 5	Nashville SC	0–1	FC Cincinnati	Nashville, Tennessee
7:30 p.m. CDT	Moore (yellow card) 56'; Bunbury (yellow card) 72'	Report	Nwobodo (yellow card) 21'; Pinto (yellow card) 45'; Vazquez 48'; Miazga (yellow card) 72'; Barreal (yellow card) 80'	Stadium: Geodis Park; Attendance: 28,453; Referee: Ismir Pekmic

April 1 MLS 6	Orlando City SC	0–2	Nashville SC	Orlando, Florida
6:30 p.m. CDT	Schlegel (yellow card) 48'; Smith (yellow card) 64'	Report	Haakenson (yellow card) 26'; Godoy (yellow card) 27'; Picault 28', (yellow card) 64'; Mukhtar 74'	Stadium: Exploria Stadium; Attendance: 20,115; Referee: Chris Penso

April 8 MLS 7	Nashville SC	0–0	Toronto FC	Nashville, Tennessee
7:30 p.m. CDT	Picault (yellow card) 34'; Lovitz (yellow card) 80'	Report	Petretta (yellow card) 37'; Osorio (yellow card) 44'	Stadium: Geodis Park; Attendance: 26,999; Referee: Guido Gonzales Jr.

April 15 MLS 8	New York City FC	2–1	Nashville SC	New York City, New York
6:30 p.m. CDT	Parks 11'; Chanot 25'; Ilenic (yellow card) 45+4'; Jasson (yellow card) 76'	Report	Mukhtar 81'	Stadium: Citi Field; Attendance: 18,687; Referee: Allen Chapman

April 22 MLS 9	Nashville SC	1–1	Los Angeles FC	Nashville, Tennessee
7:30 p.m. CDT	Mukhtar 35'	Report	Maldonado (yellow card) 8'; Bouanga 59'; Dueñas (yellow card) 69'; Jesús Murillo (yellow card) 88'	Stadium: Geodis Park; Attendance: 30,109; Referee: Ted Unkel

April 29 MLS 10	Nashville SC	3–1	Atlanta United FC	Nashville, Tennessee
7:30 p.m. CDT	Picault 36'; Muyl (yellow card) 48'; Bunbury 56'; Shaffelburg 90+1'	Report	Lennon (yellow card) 35'; Almada 72' (pen.); Purata (yellow card) 87'; Sosa (yellow card) 90+4'	Stadium: Geodis Park; Attendance: 28,793; Referee: Joe Dickerson

May 6 MLS 11	Nashville SC	3–0	Chicago Fire FC	Nashville, Tennessee
7:30 p.m. CDT	Lovitz (yellow card) 29'; Mukhtar 45+3' (pen.), 70' (pen.), 90+1'; Bunbury (yellow card) 56'; Moore (yellow card) 77'	Report	Koutsias (yellow card) 36'; Omsberg (yellow card) 52'; Burks (yellow card) 67'; Aceves (yellow card) 88'	Stadium: Geodis Park; Attendance: 28,611; Referee: Mark Allatin

May 13 MLS 12	D.C. United	1–1	Nashville SC	Washington, D.C.
6:30 p.m. CDT	Pines (yellow card) 46'; Ku-DiPietro 83'; Williams (yellow card) 85'	Report	Muyl (yellow card) 45+1', (goal) 73'; Mukhtar (yellow card) 54'	Stadium: Audi Field; Attendance: 19,215; Referee: Nima Saghafi

May 17 MLS 13	Nashville SC	2–1	Inter Miami CF	Nashville, Tennessee
7:30 p.m. CDT	Picault 33'; MacNaughton 49'	Report	Negri (yellow card) 18'; Arroyo (yellow card) 52' (goal) 90+3'; Neville (yellow card) 56'	Stadium: Geodis Park; Attendance: 25,839; Referee: Alex Chilowicz

May 20 MLS 14	Charlotte FC	1–2	Nashville SC	Charlotte, North Carolina
6:30 p.m. CDT	Bronico 6', (yellow card) 54'; Byrne (yellow card) 11'	Report	Bunbury (yellow card) 34'; Mukhtar 39', 90+3' (pen.); McCarty (yellow card) 69'	Stadium: Bank of America Stadium; Attendance: 30,526; Referee: Rubiel Vazquez

May 28 MLS 15	Nashville SC	3–1	Columbus Crew	Nashville, Tennessee
7:30 p.m. CDT	McCarty (yellow card) 19'; Picault 56'; Moore (yellow card) 60'; Godoy (yellow card) 77'; Bunbury 80'; Mukhtar 90+7'	Report	Yeboah 2'; Vallecilla (yellow card) 5'; Morris (yellow card) 90'	Stadium: Geodis Park; Attendance: 30,109; Referee: Victor Rivas

June 3 MLS 16	FC Dallas	1–2	Nashville SC	Frisco, Texas
7:30 p.m. CDT	Obrian 25'; Norris (yellow card) 43'	Report	Norris 9' (o.g.); Mukhtar 77'; Greguš (yellow card) 88'; Washington (yellow card) 90+6'	Stadium: Toyota Stadium; Attendance: 16,890; Referee: Pierre-Luc Lauziere

June 10 MLS 17	Toronto FC	1–1	Nashville SC	Toronto, Ontario
6:30 p.m. CDT	Insigne 38'; Mabika (yellow card) 72'	Report	Bauer (yellow card) 35'; Leal 69'	Stadium: BMO Field; Attendance: 27,228; Referee: Jon Freemon

June 17 MLS 18	Nashville SC	3–1	St. Louis City SC	Nashville, Tennessee
7:30 p.m. CDT	Mukhtar 11', 70', 75'; Bauer (yellow card) 37'; McCarty (yellow card) 45+1'; Washington (yellow card) 83'; Zubak (yellow card) 87'	Report	Vassilev (yellow card) 33'; Gioacchini 41'; Hiebert (yellow card) 54' (yellow-red card) 68'	Stadium: Geodis Park; Attendance: 30,109; Referee: Nima Saghafi

June 21 MLS 19	CF Montréal	1–0	Nashville SC	Montreal, Quebec
6:30 p.m. CDT	Corbo (yellow card) 13'; Wanyama (yellow card) 20'; Duke 27'	Report		Stadium: Saputo Stadium; Attendance: 16,247; Referee: Tori Penso

June 24 MLS 20	Columbus Crew	2–0	Nashville SC	Columbus, Ohio
6:30 p.m. CDT	Ramírez 20'; Moreira (yellow card) 59'; Maher 90+5' (o.g.)	Report	Mukhtar (yellow card) 60'	Stadium: Lower.com Field; Attendance: 20,443; Referee: Filip Dujic

July 1 MLS 21	Nashville SC	2–0	D.C. United	Nashville, Tennessee
7:30 p.m. CDT	Leal 18', (yellow card) 34', (goal) 37'; Zimmerman (yellow card) 20' (yellow-red card) 64'; Bunbury (yellow card) 66'	Report	Benteke (yellow card) 39'; Fountas (yellow card) 74'	Stadium: Geodis Park; Attendance: 30,109; Referee: Guido Gonzales Jr.

July 8 MLS 22	Chicago Fire FC	1–0	Nashville SC	Chicago, Illinois
7:30 p.m. CDT	Herbers 34'; Kamara (yellow card) 81'	Report	Leal (yellow card) 37'; Lovitz (yellow card) 86'	Stadium: Soldier Field; Attendance: 22,348; Referee: Pierre-Luc Lauziere

July 12 MLS 23	Nashville SC	0–2	Philadelphia Union	Nashville, Tennessee
7:30 p.m. CDT	Lovitz (yellow card) 39' (yellow-red card) 81'; Leal (yellow card) 43'; Bunbury (yellow card) 71'; Moore (red card) 90+5'	Report	Gazdag 40' (pen.), 84' (pen.), (yellow card) 84'; Wagner (yellow card) 44'; Carranza (red card) 90+5'	Stadium: Geodis Park; Attendance: 30,109; Referee: Sergii Boiko

July 15 MLS 24	FC Cincinnati	3–1	Nashville SC	Cincinnati, Ohio
6:30 p.m. CDT	Arias (yellow card) 26', (goal) 74'; Acosta 42' (pen.), (yellow card) 45+7'; Miazga (yellow card) 62'; Vázquez (yellow card) 87'; Boupendza 90+9', (yellow card) 90+11'	Report	Zimmerman 31'; Washington (yellow card) 37' (yellow-red card) 68'; Picault (yellow card) 62' (yellow-red card) 70'; Haakenson (yellow card) 86'	Stadium: TQL Stadium; Attendance: 25,513; Referee: Ramy Touchan

August 26 MLS 25	Atlanta United FC	4–0	Nashville SC	Atlanta, Georgia
6:30 p.m. CDT	Silva 26'; Muyumba (yellow card) 34'; Almada 46'; Robinson 57'; Wolff (yellow card) 66'; Lobzhanidze 87'	Report		Stadium: Mercedes-Benz Stadium; Attendance: 67,514; Referee: Jon Freemon

August 30 MLS 26	Inter Miami CF	0–0	Nashville SC	Fort Lauderdale, Florida
6:30 p.m. CDT	Gómez (yellow card) 45+1'; Busquets (yellow card) 45+2'; Taylor (yellow card) 50'; Avilés (yellow card) 77'	Report	McCarty (yellow card) 59'; Maher (yellow card) 81'	Stadium: DRV PNK Stadium; Attendance: 20,452; Referee: Chris Penso

September 2 MLS 27	Nashville SC	1–1	Charlotte FC	Nashville, Tennessee
7:30 p.m. CDT	Mukhtar (yellow card) 26', (goal) 90+8' (pen.); McCarty (yellow card) 56'; Godoy (yellow card) 73'; Bunbury (yellow card) 90+2'	Report	Jones (yellow card) 27'; Malanda (yellow card) 89'; Arfield 90+3'; Byrne (yellow card) 90+6'	Stadium: Geodis Park; Attendance: 27,902; Referee: Alex Chilowicz

September 20 MLS 28	Sporting Kansas City	0–3	Nashville SC	Kansas City, Kansas
7:30 p.m. CDT	Rosero (yellow card) 90+4'	Report	Picault 29'; Muyl (yellow card) 52'; Mukhtar 66'; Maher 76'; Washington (yellow card) 82'; Moore (yellow card) 90+1'	Stadium: Children's Mercy Park; Attendance: 16,825; Referee: Victor Rivas

September 23 MLS 29	San Jose Earthquakes	1–1	Nashville SC	San Jose, California
9:30 p.m. CDT	Espinoza (yellow card) 10'; Gruezo (yellow card) 54'; Hoppe 74'	Report	Godoy (yellow card) 11'; Bunbury 50'; Zimmerman (yellow card) 89'	Stadium: PayPal Park; Attendance: 16,728; Referee: Joseph Dickerson

September 30 MLS 30	Nashville SC	0–0	Seattle Sounders FC	Nashville, Tennessee
7:30 p.m. CDT	Godoy (yellow card) 31'; Mukhtar (yellow card) 60'; Lovitz (yellow card) 90+2'	Report		Stadium: Geodis Park; Attendance: 28,291; Referee: Chris Penso

October 4 MLS 31	Nashville SC	0–1	Orlando City SC	Nashville, Tennessee
7:30 p.m. CDT	Anunga (yellow card) 34'; Mukhtar (yellow card) 38'; Surridge (yellow card) 41'; Lovitz (yellow card) 79' (yellow-red card) 90+11'; Bunbury (yellow card) 90+12'	Report	McGuire 44'; Cartagena (yellow card) 46'	Stadium: Geodis Park; Attendance: 25,273; Referee: Rosendo Mendoza

October 7 MLS 32	Philadelphia Union	0–0	Nashville SC	Chester, Pennsylvania
6:30 p.m. CDT	Martínez (yellow card) 24'; Glesnes (yellow card) 90'	Report	Maher (yellow card) 18'; Zimmerman (yellow card) 72'	Stadium: Subaru Park; Attendance: 19,387; Referee: Armando Villarreal

October 14 MLS 33	Nashville SC	3–2	New England Revolution	Nashville, Tennessee
7:30 p.m. CDT	McCarty 19', (yellow card) 59'; Surridge 30', 45+3'; Mukhtar (yellow card) 42'	Report	Chancalay 49', 71'; Polster (yellow card) 90'	Stadium: Geodis Park; Attendance: 27,780; Referee: Guido Gonzales Jr.
Note: Match rescheduled from August 20 due to Nashville SC's participation in the Leagues Cup final.

October 21 MLS 34	Nashville SC	0–1	New York Red Bulls	Nashville, Tennessee
5:00 p.m. CDT	Picault (yellow card) 45+3'	Report	Reyes (yellow card) 39'; Amaya (yellow card) 45+1'; Nealis (yellow card) 45+6'; Duncan (yellow card) 70'; Tolkin 90+4'	Stadium: Geodis Park; Attendance: 27,875; Referee: Lukasz Szpala

=== MLS Cup Playoffs ===
October 30 Round One	Orlando City SC	1–0	Nashville SC	Orlando, Florida
7:00 pm EDT	Araújo (yellow card) 37'; Cartagena 41'; Schlegel (yellow card) 50'	Report	Lovitz (yellow card) 71'; Godoy (yellow card) 90+1'	Stadium: Exploria Stadium; Attendance: 19,744; Referee: Armando Villarreal

November 7 Round One	Nashville SC	0–1	Orlando City SC	Nashville, Tennessee
7:00 pm EST	Surridge (yellow card) 23'; Godoy (yellow card) 24'; Bunbury (yellow card) 88'; Lovitz (yellow card) 90+3'	Report	Angulo 6'; Cartagena (yellow card) 27'; Pereyra (yellow card) 36'; Santos (yellow card) 60'; Schlegel (yellow card) 90+2'; Gallese (yellow card) 90+2'	Stadium: Geodis Park; Attendance: 25,315; Referee: Allen Chapman
Note: Orlando City SC won the series 2–0.

=== U.S. Open Cup ===
April 26 Third round	Nashville SC (MLS)	1–0	San Antonio FC (USLC)	Nashville, Tennessee
7:30 p.m. CDT	Zubak 71'; Picault (yellow card) 88'	Report	Smith (yellow card) 33'; Batista (yellow card) 61'; Hernández (yellow card) 79'	Stadium: Geodis Park; Attendance: 5,467; Referee: Sergii Demianchuk

May 10 Round of 32	Nashville SC (MLS)	2–0	FC Dallas (MLS)	Nashville, Tennessee
7:30 p.m. CDT	Picault 63'; Muyl 76'	Report	Jesus (yellow card) 72'; Velasco (yellow card) 88'	Stadium: Geodis Park; Attendance: 5,196; Referee: Lukasz Szpala

May 23 Round of 16	Inter Miami CF (MLS)	2–1	Nashville SC (MLS)	Fort Lauderdale, Florida
6:30 p.m. CDT	Negri 57'; Miller (yellow card) 71'; Stefanelli 73'; Borgelin (yellow card) 89'	Report	Washington (yellow card) 29'; Greguš (yellow card) 51'; Maher (yellow card) 54'; Muyl 66'	Stadium: DRV PNK Stadium; Attendance: 2,244; Referee: Lukasz Szpala

=== Leagues Cup ===
==== Central 4 ====
Pos	Team	Pld	W	PW	PL	L	GF	GA	GD	Pts	Qualification	TOL	NAS	COL
1	(Mexico) Toluca	2	2	0	0	0	8	4	+4	6	Advance to knockout stage	—	—	4–1
2	(United States) Nashville SC	2	1	0	0	1	5	5	0	3	Advance to knockout stage	3–4	—	2–1
3	(United States) Colorado Rapids	2	0	0	0	2	2	6	−4	0		—	—	—

Source: Leagues Cup
Rules for classification: Tiebreakers

July 23	Nashville SC (United States)	2–1	(United States) Colorado Rapids	Nashville, Tennessee
7:30 p.m. CDT	Mukhtar 57'; Shaffelburg 65'; Bunbury (yellow card) 90+3'	Report	Gutman 80'	Stadium: Geodis Park; Attendance: 16,087; Referee: David Gómez

July 27	Nashville SC (United States)	3–4	(Mexico) Toluca	Nashville, Tennessee
7:30 p.m. CDT	Zimmerman 3'; Picault (yellow card) 22', (goal) 37'; Shaffelburg (yellow card) 66'; Bunbury (yellow card) 66' (yellow-red card) 86'; Haakenson 70', (yellow card) 78'	Report	Ruiz 27', 44'; Volpi 45+8' (pen.); Morales 61'; García (yellow card) 66'; Araújo (yellow card) 90+2'	Stadium: Geodis Park; Attendance: 19,817; Referee: Ricardo Montero

==== Knockout stage ====
August 4 R32	FC Cincinnati (United States)	1–1 (4–5 p)	(United States) Nashville SC	Cincinnati, Ohio
7:00 p.m. CDT	Vazquez 85' (pen.)	Report	MacNaughton (yellow card) 59'; Godoy 64'	Stadium: TQL Stadium; Attendance: 19,911; Referee: Nima Saghafi
	Penalties
	Acosta (penalty scored); Vazquez (penalty scored); Miazga (penalty missed); Kubo (penalty scored); Barreal (penalty scored)		(penalty scored) Mukhtar; (penalty scored) Picault; (penalty scored) Godoy; (penalty scored) Zimmerman; (penalty scored) McCarty

August 8 R16	Nashville SC (United States)	2–2 (6–5 p)	(Mexico) América	Nashville, Tennessee
7:00 p.m. CDT	Zimmerman 61'; Willis (yellow card) 87'; Godoy (yellow card) 90+1'; MacNaughton (yellow card) 90+2'; Surridge 90+9'	Report	dos Santos (yellow card) 9'; Valdés 78'; Quiñones 90+4' (pen.), (yellow card) 90+5'	Stadium: Geodis Park; Attendance: 24,662; Referee: Selvin Brown
	Penalties
	Mukhtar (penalty missed); Surridge (penalty scored); Godoy (penalty scored); Zimmerman (penalty scored); McCarty (penalty scored); Maher (penalty scored); Lovitz (penalty scored)		(penalty scored) Quiñones; (penalty missed) Layún; (penalty scored) Zendejas; (penalty scored) I. Reyes; (penalty scored) Valdés; (penalty scored) Fidalgo; (penalty missed) dos Santos

August 11 QF	Nashville SC (United States)	5–0	(United States) Minnesota United FC	Nashville, Tennessee
7:30 p.m. CDT	Moore 39'; Bunbury 44'; Muyl 50'; Surridge 53'; Mukhtar 59'	Report	Trapp (yellow card) 27'; Taylor (red card) 34'	Stadium: Geodis Park; Attendance: 19,915; Referee: Juan Calderón

August 15 SF	Monterrey (Mexico)	0–2	(United States) Nashville SC	Nashville, Tennessee
9:30 p.m. CDT	Guzmán (yellow card) 71'; Cortizo (yellow card) 81'; Meza (yellow card) 87'	Report	Picault (yellow card) 45', (goal) 90+6'; Surridge 67'; Panicco (yellow card) 83'	Stadium: Geodis Park; Attendance: 27,732; Referee: Walter López

August 19 F	Nashville SC (United States)	1–1 (9–10 p)	(United States) Inter Miami CF	Nashville, Tennessee
8:00 p.m. CDT	Godoy (yellow card) 54'; Picault 57'	Report	Messi 23'; Ulloa (yellow card) 89'	Stadium: Geodis Park; Attendance: 30,109; Referee: Ismail Elfath (United States)
	Penalties
	Mukhtar (penalty scored); Leal (penalty missed); Godoy (penalty scored); Zimmerman (penalty scored); Surridge (penalty scored); Moore (penalty scored); Lovitz (penalty scored); MacNaughton (penalty scored); Davis (penalty scored); Shaffelburg (penalty scored); Panicco (penalty missed)		Messi (penalty scored); Busquets (penalty scored); Campana (penalty scored); Miller (penalty scored); Ulloa (penalty missed); Kryvtsov (penalty scored); Alba (penalty scored); Gómez (penalty scored); Ruiz (penalty scored); Yedlin (penalty scored); Callender (penalty scored)

== Players and staff ==
=== Roster ===
As of May 16, 2023

Squad no.	Name	Nationality	Position(s)	Date of birth (age)	Previous club	Notes
1	Joe Willis	United States	GK	August 10, 1988 (age 37)	(United States) Houston Dynamo FC	
2	Daniel Lovitz	United States	DF	August 27, 1991 (age 34)	(Canada) CF Montréal	
3	Lukas MacNaughton	Canada	DF	March 8, 1995 (age 30)	(Canada) Toronto FC	
4	Nick DePuy	United States	DF	November 14, 1994 (age 31)	(United States) LA Galaxy	
5	Jack Maher	United States	DF	October 28, 1999 (age 26)	(United States) Indiana Hoosiers	GA
6	Dax McCarty	United States	MF	April 30, 1987 (age 38)	(United States) Chicago Fire	
7	Fafà Picault	United States	FW	February 23, 1991 (age 35)	(United States) Houston Dynamo	
8	Randall Leal	Costa Rica	FW	January 14, 1997 (age 29)	(Costa Rica) Saprissa	
10	Hany Mukhtar	Germany	MF	March 21, 1995 (age 30)	(Denmark) Brøndby	DP
11	Ethan Zubak	United States	FW	April 15, 1998 (age 27)	(United States) LA Galaxy	HG
12	Teal Bunbury	United States	FW	February 27, 1990 (age 36)	(United States) New England Revolution	
13	Joey Skinner	United States	DF	March 28, 2003 (age 22)	(United States) Clemson Tigers	GA
14	Jacob Shaffelburg	Canada	FW	November 26, 1999 (age 26)	(Canada) Toronto FC	
16	Laurence Wyke	England	DF	September 20, 1996 (age 29)	(United States) Tampa Bay Rowdies	
17	C. J. Sapong	United States	FW	December 27, 1988 (age 37)	(United States) Chicago Fire	Traded to Toronto FC on April 25, 2023.
18	Shaq Moore	United States	DF	November 2, 1996 (age 29)	(Spain) Tenerife	
19	Alex Muyl	United States	MF	September 30, 1995 (age 30)	(United States) New York Red Bulls	HG
20	Aníbal Godoy	Panama	MF	February 10, 1990 (age 36)	(United States) San Jose Earthquakes	
21	Ahmed Longmire	United States	DF	October 11, 1999 (age 26)	(United States) UCLA Bruins	
22	Josh Bauer	United States	DF	July 22, 1998 (age 27)	(United States) Atlanta United FC	
23	Taylor Washington	United States	DF	August 16, 1993 (age 32)	(United States) Nashville SC (USL)	
24	Ján Greguš	Slovakia	MF	January 29, 1991 (age 35)	(United States) San Jose Earthquakes	
25	Walker Zimmerman	United States	DF	May 19, 1993 (age 32)	(United States) Los Angeles FC	DP
26	Luke Haakenson	United States	MF	September 10, 1997 (age 28)	(United States) Creighton Bluejays	
27	Brian Anunga	Cameroon	MF	August 10, 1996 (age 29)	(United States) Charleston Battery	
28	Tyler Freeman	United States	FW	January 9, 2003 (age 23)	(United States) Loudoun United FC	
29	Nebiyou Perry	United States	FW	October 2, 1999 (age 26)	(Sweden) Östersunds FK	
30	Elliot Panicco	United States	GK	November 18, 1996 (age 29)	(United States) Charlotte 49ers	
54	Sean Davis	United States	MF	February 8, 1993 (age 33)	(United States) New York Red Bulls	
67	Ben Martino	United States	GK	September 13, 2002 (age 23)	(United States) Virginia Tech Hokies	HG
91	Kemy Amiche	France	MF	December 10, 2000 (age 25)	(United States) Campbell Fighting Camels	

=== Coaching staff ===
As of May 16, 2023

Technical Staff
Head coach	Gary Smith
Assistant coach	Steve Guppy
Assistant coach	Kosuke Kimura
Goalkeeping coach	Matt Pickens
