= Chrisnovic N'sa =

Canadian soccer player (born 1999)

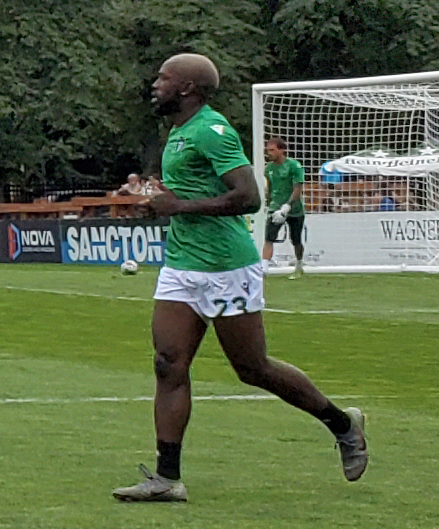
- N'sa with York United in 2022

Personal information
- Full name: Chrisnovic Isemoli N'sa
- Date of birth: January 28, 1999 (age 27)
- Place of birth: Montreal, Quebec, Canada
- Height: 1.83 m (6 ft 0 in)
- Position: Defender

Team information
- Current team: Cork City
- Number: 23

Youth career
- AS Concordia
- CS Panellinios
- 2016–2018: Montreal Impact

Senior career*
Years	Team	Apps	(Gls)
2018	CS Longueuil	3	(0)
2019–2020	HFX Wanderers	26	(0)
2021–2022	York United	53	(3)
2023	Huntsville City	25	(2)
2023	→ Nashville SC (loan)	0	(0)
2024–2025	Östersunds FK	23	(1)
2026	Gżira United	17	(0)
2026–	Cork City	4	(0)
- * Club domestic league appearances and goals as of 16:32, 10 November 2026 (UTC)

Chrisnovic Isemoli N'sa (born January 28, 1999) is a Canadian professional soccer player who plays for Cork City in the League of Ireland First Division.

== Early life ==
N'sa began playing youth soccer at age nine with AS Concordia. Afterwards, he played for CS Panellinios. In 2016, he joined the Montreal Impact Academy, where he played for two years, before departing in 2018, after he aged out of the program.

== Club career ==
In 2018, he joined CS Longueuil in the Première ligue de soccer du Québec.

In February 2019, N'sa signed his first professional contract with Canadian Premier League side HFX Wanderers. In December 2019, N'sa re-signed with Wanderers for the 2020 season. He was only one of seven returning players for the side in 2020, from the 2019 season. He helped the Wanderers reach the 2020 CPL Championship final, where they were defeated by Forge FC. After the 2020 season, he was nominated for the CPL U-21 Player of the Year award.

In November 2020, N'sa signed with York United, joining his brother Felix who had signed with the club the day before. He declined an extension from the Wanderers, as well as offers from other CPL clubs and foreign clubs in order to sign with York. He made his debut for York in their 2021 season opener against Cavalry FC on June 27, 2021. N'Sa scored his first goal for York on October 24 against Atlético Ottawa. After the end of the season, York exercised his club option for the 2022 season. In December 2022, York revealed they could not agree to terms over a new contract, and that N'Sa would be departing the club.

In February 2023, he joined Huntsville City FC in MLS Next Pro. He made his debut on March 26 against Crown Legacy FC. He joined the first team, on a short-term loan, for a US Open Cup match in April, but did not appear in the match.

In January 2024, N'sa signed with Superettan club Östersunds FK on a two-year contract. He departed the club at the end of the 2025 season, having scored two goals in 28 total appearances.

In January 2026, he signed with Gżira United in the Maltese Premier League, on a two-year contract.

On 6 July 2026, N'sa signed for League of Ireland First Division club Cork City.

== International career ==
In 2014, he made his debut in the Canadian youth program at an identification camp for the Canada U15 team.

In 2017, he was called up to a Quebec-Canada U20 team to play friendlies against Haiti U20, who were preparing for the 2017 Jeux de la Francophonie. He was then named to the Quebec U20 team for the 2017 Jeux de la Francophonie.

== Personal life ==
His younger brother, Felix, is also a professional soccer player. N'sa has a big presence on the social media app TikTok, with him being nicknamed 'TikTok Man' by his HFX Wanderers coach Stephen Hart.

== Career statistics ==
As of match played on 9 October 2026

Appearances and goals by club, season and competition
Club	Season	League			Playoffs		National cup		Other		Total	
Club	Season	Division	Apps	Goals	Apps	Goals	Apps	Goals	Apps	Goals	Apps	Goals
CS Longueuil	2018	Première Ligue de soccer du Québec	3	0	—		—		0	0	3	0
HFX Wanderers FC	2019	Canadian Premier League	18	0	—		3	0	—		10	0
HFX Wanderers FC	2020	Canadian Premier League	8	0	1	0	—		—		27	0
HFX Wanderers FC	Total		26	0	1	0	3	0	0	0	30	0
York United FC	2021	Canadian Premier League	26	1	1	0	2	0	—		29	1
York United FC	2022	Canadian Premier League	27	2	—		3	0	—		30	2
York United FC	Total		53	3	1	0	5	0	0	0	59	3
Huntsville City FC	2023	MLS Next Pro	25	2	—		—		—		25	2
Nashville SC (loan)	2023	Major League Soccer	0	0	0	0	0	0	0	0	0	0
Östersunds FK	2024	Superettan	20	1	—		3	0	1 (Note: Appearance(s) in Relegation play-offs)	1	24	2
Östersunds FK	2025	Superettan	3	0	—		1	1	—		4	1
Östersunds FK	Total		23	1	0	0	4	1	1	1	28	3
Gżira United	2025–26	Maltese Premier League	17	0	—		4	0	—		21	0
Cork City	2026	League of Ireland First Division	4	0	—		0	0	—		4	0
Career total			151	6	2	0	16	1	1	1	170	8
