= Sergi Oriol =

Spanish footballer (born 2004)

Personal information
- Full name: Sergi Oriol Herrera
- Date of birth: 24 April 2004 (age 22)
- Place of birth: Barcelona, Spain
- Position: Defensive midfielder

Team information
- Current team: Montevideo Wanderers (on loan from Peñarol)
- Number: 8

Youth career
- 2011–2017: Barcelona
- 2018–2021: Damm
- 2021–2023: La Nucía

Senior career*
Years	Team	Apps	(Gls)
2022–2023	La Nucía B	3	(0)
2023	Horta	7	(2)
2024	Huntsville City FC	6	(0)
2024–2025	La Nucía	17	(0)
2025–	Peñarol	0	(0)
2026–	→ Montevideo Wanderers (loan)	2	(0)
- * Club domestic league appearances and goals as of 20:18, 24 September 2026 (UTC)

Sergi Oriol Herrera (born 24 April 2004) is a Spanish footballer who plays as a defensive midfielder for Uruguayan club Montevideo Wanderers, on loan from Peñarol.

== Career ==
Born in Barcelona, Oriol was a youth player for FC Barcelona between the ages of seven and thirteen, though as a local he did not live in the La Masia accommodation. He played in the 5–0 loss in a youth competition to Real Betis that resulted in his club signing Gavi from the opposition. He continued his youth career for CF Damm and CF La Nucía before moving into senior football with UA Horta in 2023, in the sixth-tier Lliga Elit. For several months in 2024 he played for Huntsville City FC, the MLS Next Pro affiliate of Nashville SC, before returning to La Nucía in the fifth-tier Tercera Federación in October.

In late August 2025, Oriol returned to the Americas, signing for Peñarol in Uruguay and being assigned to the reserve team. The following February, while on loan to Montevideo Wanderers, he suffered a tibia and fibula break and was ruled out for several months.
