= Isaiah Johnston =

Canadian soccer player (born 2001)

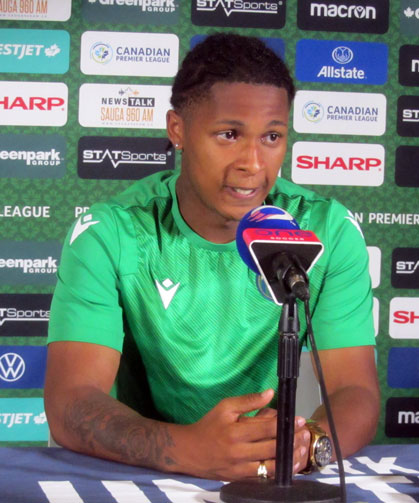
- Johnston in 2022

Personal information
- Full name: Isaiah Johnston
- Date of birth: December 16, 2001 (age 24)
- Place of birth: Mississauga, Ontario, Canada
- Height: 1.77 m (5 ft 10 in)
- Position: Midfielder

Team information
- Current team: HFX Wanderers
- Number: 8

Youth career
- Georgetown SC
- Milton YSC

College career
| Years | Team | Apps | (Gls) |
| 2019 | CBU Capers | 8 | (1) |

Senior career*
| Years | Team | Apps | (Gls) |
| 2017–2019 | Woodbridge Strikers | 24 | (2) |
| 2020–2022 | York United | 47 | (3) |
| 2023–2024 | Huntsville City | 33 | (3) |
| 2024 | Loudoun United | 14 | (1) |
| 2025– | HFX Wanderers | 40 | (7) |
- * Club domestic league appearances and goals as of June 29, 2026

Isaiah Johnston (born December 16, 2001) is a Canadian professional soccer player who plays as a midfielder for HFX Wanderers.

== Early life ==
Johnston was born in Mississauga, before moving to Georgetown, when he was one year old. There, he began playing soccer at age six with Georgetown SC. At age thirteen, he and his family moved to Milton, where he played for Milton YSC. In 2017, he was named to the U18 Team Ontario for the 2017 Canada Summer Games.

== University career ==
In October 2018, he committed to attend Cape Breton University to play for the Cape Breton Capers for the fall of 2019. During 2019, he was named Player of the Game twice — on September 15 in a 5–0 win over the Mount Allison Mounties and on September 22 in a 6–0 win over the Acadia Axemen.

In his rookie season, he won a bronze medal at the national championships and he was named the AUS Rookie of the Year and was named to the All-Rookie Team. After one season, he departed Cape Breton, opting to turn professional instead.

== Club career ==
From 2017 to 2019, Johnston played for League1 Ontario side Woodbridge Strikers. In 2019, he was invited to pre-season with York9 FC of the Canadian Premier League and was then invited to continue with their pre-season camp later in the Dominican Republic.

At the 2019 CPL–U Sports Draft, Johnston was selected 10th overall by York9 FC (later renamed York United). In July 2020, he signed his first professional contract with York. 2021 was a breakout season for Johnston, as he became a regular starter, and was ranked the 27th best player in the Canadian Premier League at the end of the season.

Johnston scored his first goal for York on July 24, 2021 against FC Edmonton. In 2021, he was nominated for the CPL Assist of the Year. In November 2021, he signed an extension with the club. On July 15, 2022, he recorded two assists in a match against Pacific FC.

In December 2022, Johnston transferred to MLS Next Pro side Huntsville City FC, the reserve side of Nashville SC, for the 2023 season, becoming the team's first ever signing. He made his debut on March 26 against Crown Legacy FC. He scored his first goal on May 12 against Chicago Fire FC II. On July 9, 2023, he scored a brace in a 6-2 victory over Orlando City B.

In late June 2024, Johnston joined USL Championship club Loudoun United FC on a transfer, signing a two-year contract with options for 2026 and 2027. He made his debut on June 29, in a substitute appearance, against the Tampa Bay Rowdies. On January 15, 2025, Johnston was sold to Canadian Premier League side HFX Wanderers for an undisclosed fee, signing a two-year contract with an option for 2027.

== International career ==
In 2016, Johnston made his debut in the Canadian youth program at age 14 at an identification camp for the Canada U15 team. In May 2016, he was named to the Canada U15 Select squad for the Canada Soccer U-15 Showcase, facing the Toronto FC Academy, Montreal Impact Academy, and Vancouver Whitecaps Academy teams.

== Career statistics ==
As of October 27, 2025

Club statistics
| Club | Season | League | | | Playoffs | | Domestic Cup | | Total | |
| Club | Season | Division | Apps | Goals | Apps | Goals | Apps | Goals | Apps | Goals |
|---|---|---|---|---|---|---|---|---|---|---|
| Woodbridge Strikers | 2017 | League1 Ontario | 5 | 1 | 0 | 0 | — | | 5 | 1 |
| Woodbridge Strikers | 2018 | League1 Ontario | 7 | 0 | 3 | 0 | — | | 10 | 0 |
| Woodbridge Strikers | 2019 | League1 Ontario | 12 | 1 | 0 | 0 | — | | 12 | 1 |
| Woodbridge Strikers | Total | | 24 | 2 | 3 | 0 | 0 | 0 | 27 | 2 |
| York United | 2020 | Canadian Premier League | 3 | 0 | — | | — | | 3 | 0 |
| York United | 2021 | Canadian Premier League | 25 | 3 | 1 | 0 | 2 | 0 | 28 | 3 |
| York United | 2022 | Canadian Premier League | 19 | 0 | — | | 3 | 1 | 22 | 1 |
| York United | Total | | 47 | 3 | 1 | 0 | 5 | 1 | 53 | 4 |
| Huntsville City FC | 2023 | MLS Next Pro | 20 | 3 | — | | — | | 20 | 3 |
| Huntsville City FC | 2024 | MLS Next Pro | 13 | 0 | — | | — | | 13 | 0 |
| Huntsville City FC | Total | | 33 | 3 | 0 | 0 | 0 | 0 | 33 | 3 |
| Loudoun United | 2024 | USL Championship | 14 | 1 | 0 | 0 | 0 | 0 | 14 | 1 |
| HFX Wanderers FC | 2025 | Canadian Premier League | 28 | 2 | 1 | 0 | 1 | 0 | 30 | 2 |
| Career total | | | 146 | 11 | 5 | 0 | 6 | 1 | 157 | 12 |
