= John Berner =

American soccer player (born 1991)

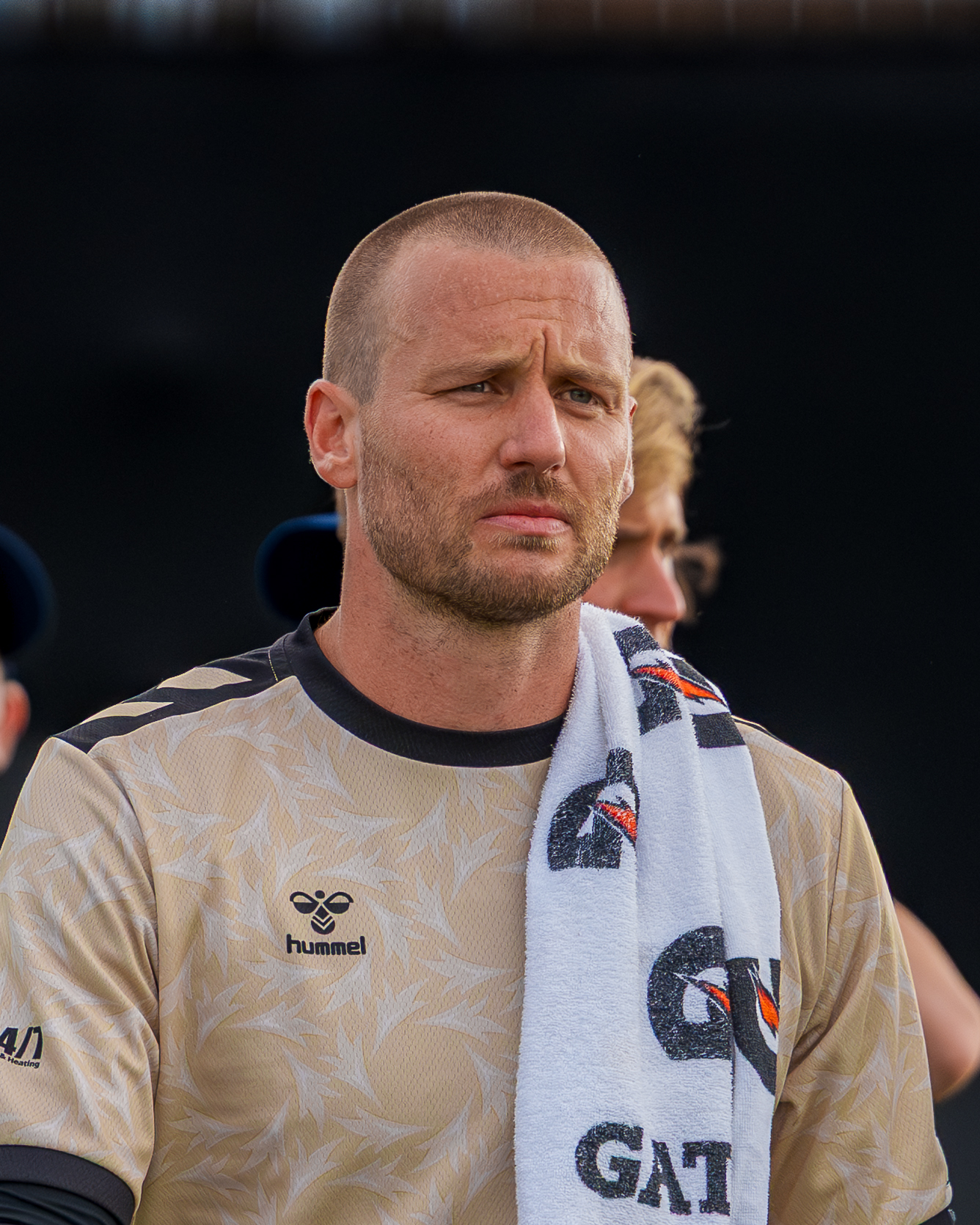
- Berner with the Charleston Battery in 2026

Personal information
- Date of birth: February 14, 1991 (age 35)
- Place of birth: St. Louis, Missouri, United States
- Height: 1.90 m (6 ft 3 in)
- Position: Goalkeeper

Team information
- Current team: Charleston Battery

College career
Years	Team	Apps	(Gls)
2010–2013	SIU Edwardsville Cougars	34	(0)

Senior career*
Years	Team	Apps	(Gls)
2012	St. Louis Lions	6	(0)
2014–2017	Colorado Rapids	5	(0)
2015–2016	→ Charlotte Independence (loan)	36	(0)
2017	→ Phoenix Rising (loan)	0	(0)
2018	Phoenix Rising	0	(0)
2018	→ Oklahoma City Energy (loan)	0	(0)
2020	Saint Louis FC	2	(0)
2021–2022	Memphis 901	8	(0)
2023	Huntsville City	8	(0)
2024	Atlanta United 2	4	(0)
2025	FC Tulsa	0	(0)
2025	Hartford Athletic	4	(0)
2026–	Charleston Battery	4	(0)

Managerial career
- 2023: Huntsville City (goalkeeping)
- * Club domestic league appearances and goals as of November 4, 2026

John Berner (born February 14, 1991) is an American professional soccer player who plays as a goalkeeper for USL Championship club Charleston Battery.

== Career ==
Born in St. Louis, Missouri, after playing for four years with the SIU Edwardsville Cougars, Berner was selected as the 35th overall pick in the 2014 MLS SuperDraft by the Colorado Rapids. He then made his professional debut for the Rapids in Major League Soccer on March 15, 2014, against the New York Red Bulls at Red Bull Arena.

In January 2020, Berner signed with his hometown club, Saint Louis FC of the USL Championship. Saint Louis FC folded following the 2020 USL Championship season.

In March 2021, Berner joined Memphis 901 FC ahead of the 2021 season. Berner played every minute in goal for Memphis until a ruptured right Achilles tendon ended his season in June. Berner was re-signed by Memphis on January 19, 2022.

On January 18, 2023, Berner joined MLS Next Pro expansion club Huntsville City as their first-ever goalkeeping coach.

On April 1, 2025, Berner signed a short-term deal with USL Championship side FC Tulsa.

Berner joined Hartford Athletic on August 27, 2025.

On February 20, 2026, Charleston Battery announced they had signed Berner to a contract ahead of the 2026 season.

== Career statistics ==
As of July 8, 2014

Club	Season	League			MLS Cup		U.S. Open Cup		CONCACAF		Total	
Club	Season	Division	Apps	Goals	Apps	Goals	Apps	Goals	Apps	Goals	Apps	Goals
Colorado Rapids	2014	MLS	5	0	—	—	0	0	—	—	5	0
Career total			5	0	0	0	0	0	0	0	5	0
