= Nebiyou Perry =

American soccer player

Personal information
- Date of birth: October 2, 1999 (age 27)
- Place of birth: New York City, New York, United States
- Position: Winger

Team information
- Current team: Kolding
- Number: 9

Youth career
- AIK

Senior career*
Years	Team	Apps	(Gls)
2017–2018	AIK	0	(0)
2018–2019	Köln II	5	(0)
2019	→ Trelleborg (loan)	7	(1)
2019–2022	Östersund	41	(0)
2023	Nashville SC	0	(0)
2023	→ Huntsville City (loan)	5	(4)
2024–2025	Östersund	41	(1)
2025–	Kolding	17	(1)

International career^{‡}
2016	Sweden U17	4	(0)
2016	United States U18	5	(3)
2017	Sweden U18	3	(0)
2018	United States U20	1	(0)
- * Club domestic league appearances and goals as of June 2, 2026 ‡ National team caps and goals as of 11:18, August 27, 2019 (UTC)

Nebiyou Sundance Perry (born October 2, 1999) is an American professional soccer player who plays as a winger for Kolding IF.

== International career ==
Perry was born in the United States to an American father and a Swedish-Ethiopian mother. He represented both Sweden and the United States at youth level.

== Career statistics ==
=== Club ===
As of match played 12 April 2025

Appearances and goals by club, season and competition
Club	Season	League			National cup (Note: Includes Svenska Cupen, U.S. Open Cup)		Continental		Other		Total	
Club	Season	Division	Apps	Goals	Apps	Goals	Apps	Goals	Apps	Goals	Apps	Goals
AIK	2017	Allsvenskan	0	0	0	0	1 (Note: Appearance(s) in UEFA Europa League)	0	—		1	0
FC Köln II	2017–18	Regionalliga West	0	0	—		—		—		0	0
FC Köln II	2018–19	Regionalliga West	5	0	—		—		—		5	0
FC Köln II	Total		5	0	—		—		—		5	0
Trelleborgs (loan)	2019	Superettan	7	1	0	0	—		—		7	1
Östersunds FK	2019	Allsvenskan	6	0	4	0	—		—		10	0
Östersunds FK	2020	Allsvenskan	26	0	1	1	—		—		27	1
Östersunds FK	2021	Allsvenskan	9	0	0	0	—		—		9	0
Östersunds FK	2022	Superettan	0	0	0	0	—		0	0	0	0
Östersunds FK	Total		41	0	5	1	—		0	0	46	1
Nashville SC	2023	MLS	0	0	0	0	0	0	0	0	0	0
Huntsville City (loan)	2023	MLS Next Pro	18	4	—		—		—		18	4
Östersunds FK	2024	Superettan	21	0	3	0	—		2 (Note: Appearance(s) in Superettan play-off)	0	26	0
Östersunds FK	2025	Superettan	3	0	0	0	—		—		3	0
Östersunds FK	Total		24	0	3	0	—		2	0	29	0
Career total			95	5	8	1	1	0	2	0	106	6
