= Christopher Pearson (footballer) =

Jamaican footballer (born 2003)

Personal information
- Full name: Christopher Ricardo Junior Pearson
- Date of birth: 21 January 2003 (age 23)
- Place of birth: Montego Bay, Jamaica
- Height: 1.88 m (6 ft 2 in)
- Position: Midfielder

Team information
- Current team: St. Louis City 2
- Number: 41

Youth career
- 2019–2022: Kingston College

Senior career*
Years	Team	Apps	(Gls)
2022	Cavalier	8	(1)
2022–2023	FC Tulsa	6	(0)
2023	→ Huntsville City FC (loan)	4	(0)
2024	Columbus Crew 2	15	(2)
2025	Las Vegas Lights	22	(0)
2026–	St. Louis City 2	1	(0)

International career^{‡}
2022	Jamaica U20	5	(0)
2022–	Jamaica	0	(0)
- * Club domestic league appearances and goals as of 19:40, 28 February 2026 (CST) ‡ National team caps and goals as of 13:14, 30 December 2022 (UTC)

Christopher Ricardo Junior Pearson (born 21 January 2003) is a Jamaican professional footballer who plays as a midfielder for St. Louis City 2 in the MLS Next Pro.

== Club career ==
=== Youth ===
Pearson spent four years at Kingston College from 2019 to 2022. Pearson was named the MVP of the league in 2022 after finishing as its leading goalscorer with nine goals.

=== Cavalier ===
In 2022, Pearson signed with National Premier League side Cavalier, where he debuted on 14 March 2022, scoring an 89th–minute goal against Molynes United.

=== FC Tulsa ===
On 19 July 2022, Pearson made the move to the United States, joining USL Championship side FC Tulsa. Following the 2022 season, he re-signed with the club for 2023.

=== Las Vegas Lights ===
In 2025, Pearson moved to Las Vegas Lights in the USL Championship.

=== St. Louis City 2 ===
On 6 February 2026, CITY2 announced sign Christopher Pearson to a one-year MLS Next Pro contract with an option to June 2027.

== International career ==
Pearson has been capped five times at under-20 level for the Jamaican national team. He was also selected by Jamaica's senior squad three times in its final 2022 FIFA World Cup qualification window in March 2022 in fixtures against El Salvador, Canada, and Honduras.
