= Jordan Knight (soccer) =

Canadian soccer player (born 2003)

Personal information
- Date of birth: 13 June 2003 (age 23)
- Place of birth: Mississauga, Ontario, Canada
- Height: 1.91 m (6 ft 3 in)
- Position: Left-back

Team information
- Current team: Nashville SC
- Number: 23

Youth career
- Brampton East
- 2020–2022: Athlete Institute

Senior career*
Years	Team	Apps	(Gls)
2022–2024	Columbus Crew 2	42	(1)
2024–2025	Huntsville City FC	33	(8)
2024–	Nashville SC	2	(0)
- * Club domestic league appearances and goals as of May 2, 2026 ‡ National team caps and goals as of 13:52, 22 April 2026 (UTC)

Jordan Knight (born 13 June 2003) is a Canadian professional soccer player who plays as a left-back for Major League Soccer club Nashville SC.

== Club career ==
Knight is a product of the youth academies of the Canadian clubs Brampton East and Athlete Institute. On 2 March 2022, he joined MLS Next Pro club Columbus Crew 2. Colombus Crew 2 exercised the contract option to keep him at the club for the 2024 season on 2o November 2023. On 22 June 2024, he was acquired by Huntsville City FC, also in the MLS Next Pro. He debuted with Nashville SC in a 1–1 (6–5) penalty shootout loss in the Leagues Cup to New England Revolution on 6 August 2024. On 11 September 2025, he formally signed with Nashville FC for the 2026 Major League Soccer season, with options for 2027 and 2028. On 2 February 2026, he debuted in a 0–0 Major League Soccer tie with FC Dallas.

== Honours ==
Columbus Crew 2

- MLS Next Pro: 2022
- MLS Next Pro Cup: 2022
