= Kemy Amiche =

French footballer (born 2000)

Personal information
- Date of birth: 10 December 2000 (age 25)
- Place of birth: Goussainville, (95), France
- Height: 1.80 m (5 ft 11 in)
- Position: Winger

Team information
- Current team: Union Omaha
- Number: 95

College career
Years	Team	Apps	(Gls)
2021–2022	Campbell Fighting Camels	28	(10)

Senior career*
Years	Team	Apps	(Gls)
2018–2020	Lorient B	33	(2)
2020	Dinan Léhon	1	(0)
2022	Asheville City	12	(12)
2023	Nashville SC	0	(0)
2023	→ Huntsville City (loan)	23	(8)
2024	Asheville City	4	(2)
2024	Thionville	4	(0)
2025–	Union Omaha	0	(0)
- * Club domestic league appearances and goals as of 10 January 2025

Kemy Amiche (born 10 December 2000) is a French footballer who plays as a winger or striker for USL League One club Union Omaha.

== Early life ==
Amiche is a native of Paris, France.

== Youth career ==
As a youth player, Amiche joined the youth academy of French side FC Lorient.

== Senior club career ==
Amiche started his career with French side Lorient B, where he suffered an injury. In 2023, he signed for American side Huntsville City FC, where he was regarded as one of the club's most important players. He left Nashville following the 2023 season.

Amiche signed with USL League One club Union Omaha on 10 January 2025.

== Style of play ==
Amiche mainly operates as a winger or striker and is left-footed.

== Personal life ==
Amiche holds both French and Algerian nationalities. He has two siblings.
