= Adem Sipić =

American soccer player (born 2006)

Personal information
- Date of birth: April 5, 2006 (age 20)
- Place of birth: Bowling Green, Kentucky, U.S.
- Height: 6 ft 1 in (1.85 m)
- Position: Striker

Team information
- Current team: Gefle IF (on loan from Nashville SC)

Youth career
- Southern Kentucky SC
- –2020: BG Elite
- 2020–2023: Nashville SC

Senior career*
Years	Team	Apps	(Gls)
2023–2025	Huntsville City FC	53	(7)
2024–	Nashville SC	0	(0)
2026	→ Eintracht Braunschweig II (loan)	9	(3)
2026–	→ Gefle IF (loan)	15	(4)
- * Club domestic league appearances and goals as of 12 November 2026

Adem Sipić (born April 5, 2006) is an American professional soccer player who plays as a striker for Ettan club Gefle IF in Sweden on loan from Nashville SC.

== Early life ==
Born in Bowling Green, Kentucky, Sipić is of Bosnian descent.

== Club career ==
Sipić started his career with Huntsville City FC. On March 26, 2023, he debuted for the club during a 2–2 draw with Crown Legacy FC. On June 12, 2023, he scored his first goal for the club during a 4–2 win over St. Louis City 2.

== Style of play ==
Sipić has been described as a target forward who is naturally capable of playing with his back to goal, and is known for his strength and work rate.
