= Joey Skinner =

American soccer player (born 2003)

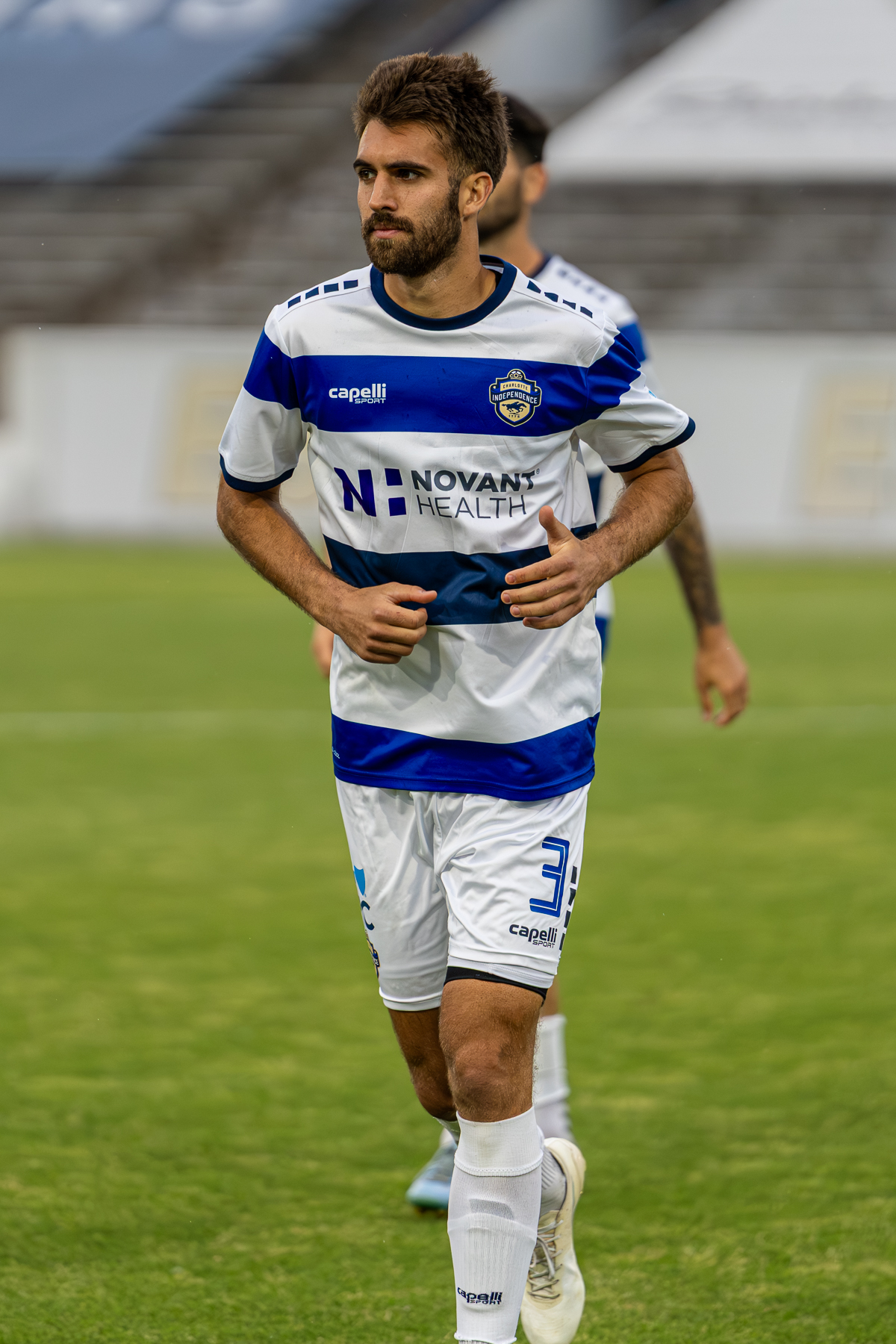
- Skinner with Charlotte Independence in 2026

Personal information
- Full name: Joseph Skinner
- Date of birth: March 28, 2003 (age 23)
- Place of birth: Rochester, NY
- Height: 1.83 m (6 ft 0 in)
- Position: Defender

Team information
- Current team: Charlotte Independence
- Number: 3

Youth career
- 2020–2021: Charlotte Independence

College career
Years	Team	Apps	(Gls)
2021	UNC Greensboro Spartans	18	(4)
2022	Clemson Tigers	21	(2)

Senior career*
Years	Team	Apps	(Gls)
2023–2024	Nashville SC	2	(0)
2023–2024	→ Huntsville City (loan)	42	(5)
2025	Tampa Bay Rowdies	23	(2)
2026–	Charlotte Independence	28	(7)
- * Club domestic league appearances and goals as of October 31, 2026

Joseph “Joey” Skinner (born March 30, 2003) is an American professional soccer player who plays for Charlotte Independence in the USL League One.

== Early life ==
Skinner attended Cox Mill High School and the UNC Greensboro before transferring to Clemson University. A left-back for UNC Greensboro, he started 17 of his 18 matches, scoring four goals with one assist.

== Career ==
=== Charlotte Independence ===
In February 2020, at sixteen years old, Skinner signed a USL Academy contract with Charlotte Independence. In the academy of Charlotte Independence he was coached by former MLS player Jeff Bilyk. Before he began his freshman year at UNC Greensboro he was named the ECNL U18/19 national player of the year as his team won the first-ever ECNL Boys U18/19 National Championship.

=== Nashville SC ===
Prior to the 2023 MLS SuperDraft, Skinner signed a Generation Adidas contract with the league. In the draft, Skinner was Nashville’s first pick, eleventh overall in the first round. In November 2023, Skinner was included in the Nashville first team roster for the 2024 season. He was released by Nashville following their 2024 season.

=== Huntsville City (loan) ===
Skinner spent the 2023 season on loan at MLS Next Pro side Huntsville City FC. He scored his first goal for Huntsville on 10 July 2023, in a 6-2 league win over Orlando City B.

=== Tampa Bay Rowdies ===
In January 2025, Skinner joined the Tampa Bay Rowdies playing in the USL Championship.

=== Charlotte Independence ===
January 30, 2026, Skinner returned to his former academy side Charlotte Independence.

== Personal life ==
Skinner played soccer with his older brother, Matthew Skinner, at UNC Greensboro.
