= Ben Martino =

American soccer player

Personal information
- Full name: Benjamin Rolland Martino
- Date of birth: September 13, 2002 (age 24)
- Height: 6 ft 6 in (1.98 m)
- Position: Goalkeeper

Youth career
- –2019: Pittsburgh Riverhounds
- 2019–2020: Philadelphia Union

College career
Years	Team	Apps	(Gls)
2021–2022	Virginia Tech	34	(0)

Senior career*
Years	Team	Apps	(Gls)
2019–2020	Philadelphia Union II	3	(0)
2022	Ocean City Nor'easters	4	(0)
2023–2024	Nashville SC	0	(0)
2023–2024	Huntsville City FC	30	(0)
2025	Pittsburgh Riverhounds	0	(0)
- * Club domestic league appearances and goals as of October 25, 2025

Benjamin Rolland Martino (born September 13, 2002) is an American professional soccer player who plays as a goalkeeper.

== Career statistics ==
=== Club ===
As of October 6, 2020

Club	Season	League			Cup		Other		Total	
Club	Season	Division	Apps	Goals	Apps	Goals	Apps	Goals	Apps	Goals
Philadelphia Union II	2020	USL Championship	3	0	–		0	0	3	0
Ocean City Nor'easters	2022	USL League Two	4	0	–		0	0	4	0
Huntsville City FC	2023	MLS Next Pro	11	0	–		0	0	11	0
Career total			18	0	0	0	0	0	18	0
