= Azaad Liadi =

American soccer player (born 1998)

Personal information
- Date of birth: May 14, 1998 (age 28)
- Place of birth: Sterling Heights, Michigan, United States
- Height: 1.85 m (6 ft 1 in)
- Position: Winger

Team information
- Current team: Greenville Triumph

College career
| Years | Team | Apps | (Gls) |
| 2016–2018 | Saginaw Valley State Cardinals | 56 | (11) |
| 2019 | Georgia Southern Eagles | 16 | (3) |

Senior career*
| Years | Team | Apps | (Gls) |
| 2018 | AFC Ann Arbor | 14 | (4) |
| 2019 | Cincinnati Dutch Lions | 14 | (1) |
| 2020 | FC Tucson | 15 | (3) |
| 2021 | South Georgia Tormenta | 27 | (9) |
| 2022 | Loudoun United | 24 | (0) |
| 2022 | → D.C. United (loan) | 1 | (0) |
| 2023 | Huntsville City | 22 | (12) |
| 2024–2025 | Lexington SC | 14 | (2) |
| 2025 | → Portland Hearts of Pine (loan) | 12 | (3) |
| 2026– | Greenville Triumph | 28 | (8) |
- * Club domestic league appearances and goals as of October 31, 2026

Azaad Liadi (born May 14, 1998) is an American soccer player who plays as a winger for Greenville Triumph in USL League One.

== Career ==
=== College ===
Liadi attended Saginaw Valley State University for three years, making 56 appearances and scoring 11 goals for their varsity soccer team. For his senior year, Liadi transferred to Georgia Southern University. He would go on to make 16 appearances, scoring three goals. During college, Liadi spent a season in the NPSL with AFC Ann Arbor, and a season in USL League Two with the Cincinnati Dutch Lions.

=== FC Tucson ===
In March 2020, Liadi signed a professional contract with FC Tucson of USL League One. He made his competitive debut for the club on July 25, 2020, against Fort Lauderdale CF.

=== South Georgia Tormenta ===
On December 17, 2020, Liadi made the move to USL League One side South Georgia Tormenta ahead of their 2021 season.

=== Loudoun United ===
On January 28, 2022, it was announced Liadi had signed with USL Championship side Loudoun United. On February 26, 2022, Liadi joined Loudoun's parent club D.C. United on a 4-day emergency loan.

=== Lexington SC ===
Liadi signed with USL League One club Lexington SC on January 19, 2024.

==== Loan to Hearts of Pine ====
On March 15, 2025, Liadi signed on loan with USL League One expansion team Portland Hearts of Pine. He scored a brace in his first match with the club, a 4–0 win against CD Faialense in the 2025 U.S. Open Cup, which was also Portland's first competitive match. He finished his time with the Hearts with six goals in 18 appearances.

=== Greenville Triumph ===
Following the conclusion of his loan to Portland, Liadi was not retained by Lexington. On February 4, 2026, Liadi signed with Greenville Triumph in USL League One.
