= Huntsville City FC =

American soccer team

- Full name: Huntsville City Football Club
- Nickname: Boys in Blue
- Founded: July 12, 2022; 4 years ago
- Stadium: Joe W. Davis Stadium; Huntsville, Alabama
- Capacity: 6,000
- Owner: Nashville SC
- Head coach: Chris O'Neal
- League: MLS Next Pro
- 2025: 5th, Eastern Conference; Playoffs: Conference Semifinals
- Website: mlsnextpro.com/huntsvillecityfc
| Home colors | Away colors | Third colors |

Huntsville City FC is an American professional soccer team based in Huntsville, Alabama. It is the reserve team of Nashville SC and plays in MLS Next Pro, the third tier of American soccer. The team plays its games at Joe Davis Stadium, a former minor league baseball stadium.

== History ==
On July 12, 2022, Nashville SC announced that it would start an MLS Next Pro team based in Huntsville, Alabama. On August 4, 2022, Huntsville was named as one of seven MLS-affiliated clubs that would field teams in the MLS Next Pro league beginning in the 2023 season. The team name and logo was announced on November 9, 2022. Huntsville City will be the only MLS reserve side that plays outside its parent team's home market.

On December 19, 2022, midfielder Isaiah Johnston from York United was announced as the club's first official signing. Transfer details were not disclosed.

On May 19, 2023, Huntsville City FC played their first ever home at Joe Davis Stadium. They defeated Crown Legacy FC in front of a sold-out crowd.

On April 10, Huntsville announced the sacking of Head Coach Jack Collison and the appointment of former Scottish international Christophe Berra in his place. On July 8, the club announced Berra would be leaving the team after the club's match against New England Revolution II on July 10 in which the team would go onto win 2-1.

On August 5, the club announced the appointment of former Inter Miami U17 manager, Chris O'Neal. This hiring would make O'Neal the second full-time Head Coach in club history.

== Colors and badge ==
The club's colors are dark blue and white, with light blue and yellow accents on the crest.

The club's crest features a checkerboard pattern and a shooting star around the club's initials, both alluding to the importance of the space industry in Huntsville's history.

== Players and staff ==
=== Roster ===
As of January 23, 2025

| No. | Pos. | Nation | Player |
|---|---|---|---|
| 4 | MF | GHA | Patrick Amarh |
| 8 | MF | PAN | Moisés Véliz |
| 9 | FW | NGR | Light Eke |
| 10 | FW | USA | Maximus Ekk |
| 11 | MF | USA | Jayvin Van Deventer |
| 12 | DF | JAM | Nigel Prince |
| 14 | FW | USA | Alioune Ka |
| 14 | MF | USA | Angel Iniguez |
| 18 | MF | USA | Nicklaus Sullivan |
| 20 | MF | ECU | Matteo Zambrano |
| 21 | DF | FRA | Kessy Coulibaly |
| 23 | FW | GHA | Shakur Mohammed |
| 24 | MF | USA | Nick Pariano |
| 26 | FW | CHI | Zidane Yáñez |
| 27 | DF | ECU | Maikel Caicedo |
| 28 | DF | USA | Zach Barrett |
| 29 | DF | USA | Julian Gaines |
| 70 | MF | JPN | Misei Yoshizawa |
| 73 | FW | JAM | Fabian Reynolds |
| 88 | MF | ANT | Aiden Jarvis (on loan from New York Red Bulls) |
| 89 | DF | USA | Leo Christiano |
| 95 | GK | USA | Will Mackay |

Nashville SC first team player.
Signed to Nashville SC Academy contract.

=== Staff ===
Coaching & Technical Staff
| Director of Soccer Operations | (England) Matt Cairns |
| Head coach | (United States) Chris O'Neal |
| Assistant coach | (United States) Zach Herold |
| Assistant coach | (United States) Alex Kuehl |
| Goalkeeping coach | Fabio Hernandez |
| Head Athletic Trainer | (United States) Luis Rodas |
| Performance Coach & Sports Scientist | (United States) Josh Stewart |
| Video Analyst/Scouting | (Brazil) Matt Bautista |
| Head Equipment Manager | (United States) Sam Gibson |

== Records ==
=== Year-by-year ===
| Season | MLS Next Pro | | | | | | | | | Playoffs | Top Scorer | |
| Season | P | W | D | L | GF | GA | Pts | Conference | Overall | Playoffs | Player | Goals |
|---|---|---|---|---|---|---|---|---|---|---|---|---|
| 2023 | 28 | 9 | 7 | 12 | 48 | 45 | 38 | 9th, Eastern | 17th | Did not qualify | (United States) Azaad Liadi | 12 |
| 2024 | 28 | 8 | 5 | 15 | 39 | 53 | 29 | 14th, Eastern | 27th | Did not qualify | (United States) Jonathan Bolanos (Haiti) Woobens Pacius | 8 |
| 2025 | 28 | 14 | 6 | 8 | 56 | 32 | 52 | 5th, Eastern | 6th | Conference Semifinals | (United States) Alan Carleton | 12 |
| 2026 | 28 | 12 | 6 | 10 | 49 | 47 | 44 | 9th, Eastern | 15th | Play-in Round | (United States) Maximus Ekk (Jamaica) Malachi Molina | 9 |

=== Head coaches record ===
As of October 11, 2026

| Name | Nationality | From | To | P | W | D | L | GF | GA | Win% |
|---|---|---|---|---|---|---|---|---|---|---|
| Jack Collison | Wales | January 18, 2023 | April 9, 2024 | 32 | 9 | 9 | 14 | 55 | 54 | 28.13 |
| Christophe Berra (Interim) | Scotland | April 9, 2024 | August 8, 2024 | 15 | 3 | 3 | 9 | 17 | 29 | 20.00 |
| Chris O'Neal | United States | August 8, 2024 | Present | 68 | 32 | 12 | 24 | 123 | 97 | 47.06 |

== Supporters ==
The club currently has 1 officially-recognized Supporters' Group called HuntsVillains.
