= 2026 Carolina Core FC season =

Carolina Core FC
2026 season
- Owner: Megan Oglesby; Matt Penley; Mark Penley
- General manager: Eddie Pope
- Head coach: Donovan Ricketts
- Stadium: Truist Point
- MLS Next Pro: Eastern Conference: Overall:
- 2026 U.S. Open Cup: First Round
- Top goalscorer: League: (Central African Republic) Arnaud Tattevin (9 Goals); All: (Central African Republic) Arnaud Tattevin (9 Goals)
- Highest home attendance: 4,483 vs New England Revolution II September 4
- Lowest home attendance: 4,016 vs Orlando City B March 14, 1,091 vs Virginia Dream FC March 19
- Average home league attendance: 4,250 (12 missing), with U.S. Open Cup 3,197
- Biggest win: Carolina Core FC 4–0 Inter Miami CF II July 22
- Biggest defeat: Carolina Core FC 1–5 Chicago Fire FC II July 25
Home colors	Away colors

The 2026 Carolina Core FC Season is the club's third season in existence. This is the second independent club to play in a MLS Next Pro season alongside Chattanooga FC and will be joined by CT United FC in 2026. The club is located in North Carolina, US.

== Players and staff ==
=== Current roster ===
As of July 13, 2026

No.	Pos.	Nation	Player
1	GK	USA	Nick Holliday (on loan from Crown Legacy FC)
2	DF	USA	Charles Orbaugh
3	DF	COL	Santiago Yepes (on loan from Leones F.C.)
4	DF	USA	Nolan Evers
5	MF	ALG	Mehdi Zerkane
6	MF	USA	Ricardo Montenengro
7	DF	NED	Tim Zeegers
8	MF	USA	Corey Lundeen
9	FW	ARM	Nicholas Kaloukian
10	FW	USA	Jesus Ibarra
11	FW	LBR	Anthony Sumo Jr.
12	MF	TAN	Alenga Charles
14	FW	USA	Khalid Balogun
15	FW	USA	Tony Pineda
16	MF	CIV	Mohamed Diakite
17	DF	ECU	Jeffrey Caiza
18	DF	USA	Dominique Colon
19	MF	USA	Seth Hammond
20	MF	NZL	Thomas Raimbault
21	MF	USA	Nelson Martinez
22	DF	USA	Nathan Brown
23	MF	USA	Robinson Aguirre
24	MF	USA	Tristan Weber
25	DF	USA	Bryce Swineheart
26	FW	CAF	Arnaud Tattevin
27	MF	USA	Andrew Czech
33	DF	USA	Bodie Ford
44	GK	USA	Trevor Jackson
55	DF	USA	Graham Ford
58	MF	USA	David Diaz
77	MF	GHA	Rashid Tetteh
80	MF	JAM	Dyllan John
88	MF	USA	Ryan Baer
90	GK	USA	Nolan Anderson
99	DF	USA	Grayson Rockhill

=== Staff ===
- Eddie Pope – Chief Sporting Officer
- Donovan Ricketts – Head Coach
- Amado Guevara – Assistant Coach
- Vacant – Goalkeeping Coach
- Robert Ritchie – Director Of Soccer Operations

== Transfers ==
=== In ===
Date	Position	Number	Name	from	Type	Fee	Ref.
January 15, 2026	MF	80	(Jamaica) Dyllan John	(Jamaica) Waterhouse FC	Signing	Free	
January 16, 2026	DF	4	(United States) Nolan Evers	(Republic of Ireland) Cobh Ramblers	Signing	Free	
January 20, 2026	MF	6	(United States) Ricardo Montenegro	(United States) Inter Miami CF II	Signing	Free	
January 22, 2026	DF	99	(United States) Grayson Rockhill	(United States) Georgia Lions	Signing	Free	
February 2, 2026	DF	21	(United States) Nelson Martinez	(El Salvador) CD Platense	Signing	Free	
February 5, 2026	MF	58	(United States) David Diaz	(United States) Ventura County FC	Signing	Free	
February 11, 2026	MF	20	(New Zealand) Thomas Raimbault	(United States) Wisconsin Badgers	Signing	Free	
February 11, 2026	MF	7	(Netherlands) Tim Zeegers	(Netherlands) MVV Maastricht	Signing	Free	
February 12, 2026	DF	18	(United States) Dominique Colon	(Spain) Barcelona City FC	Signing	Free	
February 12, 2026	DF	3	(Colombia) Santiago Yepes	(Colombia) Leones	Loan	NA	
February 12, 2026	DF	22	(United States) Nathan Brown	(United States) Southern Indiana Screaming Eagles	Loan	NA	
February 13, 2026	MF	22	(Algeria) Mehdi Zerkane	(Algeria) MC Algiers	Signing	Free	
February 13, 2026	MF	17	(Ecuador) Jair Caiza	(Ecuador) Independiente Juniors	Signing	Free	
March 7, 2026	DF	3	(United States) Charles Orbaugh	(Croatia) NK Junak Sinj	Signing	NA	
March 7, 2026	GK	1	(United States) Nick Holliday	(United States) Crown Legacy FC	Loan	NA	
March 7, 2026	GK	44	(United States) Trevor Jackson	(Germany) Eintracht Nordhorn	Signing	NA	
March 7, 2026	MF	23	(El Salvador) Robinson Aguirre	(United States) Colorado Rapids 2	Signing	NA	
March 7, 2026	GK	90	(United States) Nolan Anderson	(Spain) CD Almuñécar City	Signing	NA	
March 7, 2026	FW	14	(United States) Khalid Balogun	(United States) District Elite FC	Signing	NA	
April 1, 2026	FW	26	(Central African Republic) Arnaud Tattevin	(United States) UNCG Spartans	Signing	NA	
June 10, 2026	MF	88	(United States) Ryan Baer	(United States) Tacoma Defiance	Signing	NA	
June 10, 2026	MF	27	(United States) Andrew Czech	(United States) North Carolina Tar Heels	Signing	NA	
June 12, 2026	MF	19	(United States) Seth Hammond	(United States) Hill City FC	Signing	NA	
June 27, 2026	DF	25	(United States) Bryce Swineheart	(United States) West Virginia Mountaineers	Signing	NA	
June 28, 2026	DF	33	(United States) Bodie Ford	(United States) Barça Residency Academy	Signing	NA	
June 28, 2026	MF	55	(United States) Graham Ford	(United States) Barça Residency Academy	Signing	NA	
July 4, 2026	MF	24	(United States) Tristan Weber	(United States) Ristozi FC	Signing	NA	
July 13, 2026	FW	9	(Armenia) Nicholas Kaloukian	(Armenia) FC Urartu	Signing	NA	
July 13, 2026	DF	77	(Ghana) Rashid Tetteh	(United States) Westchester SC	Transfer	Undisclosed Sum	

=== Out ===
Date	Position	Number	Name	To	Type	Fee	Ref.
December 9, 2025	MF	3	(Jamaica) Zion Scarlett	(United States) Portland Hearts of Pine	Contract Expired	NA	
December 17, 2025	DF	2	(United States) Daniel Chica	(United States) Atlanta United 2	Contract Expired	NA	
December 19, 2025	GK	0	(United States) Alex Sutton	(United States) Sarasota Paradise	Contract Expired	NA	
December 19, 2025	GK	1	(United States) Andrew Pannenberg	"Unattached"	Contract Expired	NA	
December 19, 2025	DF	4	(United States) Kai Thomas	(United States) Colorado Rapids 2	Contract Expired	NA	
December 19, 2025	MF	17	(Republic of Ireland) Glory Nzingo	(Republic of Ireland) St Patrick's Athletic	Loan Expired	NA	
December 19, 2025	DF	6	(Argentina) Juan Pablo Rodriguez	"Unattached"	Contract Expired	NA	
December 19, 2025	FW	7	(United States) Yekeson Subah	"Unattached"	Contract Expired	NA	
December 19, 2025	FW	8	(Antigua and Barbuda) Drake Hadeed	(Spain) Antequera U19s	Contract Expired	NA	
December 19, 2025	M2F	10	(England) Jacob Evans	(United States) Sporting JAX	Contract Expired	NA	
December 19, 2025	FW	13	(Honduras) Josuha Rodriguez	"Unattached"	Contract Expired	NA	
December 19, 2025	DF	14	(United States) Jathan Juarez	"Unattached"	Contract Expired	NA	
December 19, 2025	FW	15	(Colombia) David Polanco	(Kyrgyzstan) FC Talant	Contract Expired	NA	
December 19, 2025	MF	19	(Colombia) Mateo Sarmiento	"Unattached"	Contract Expired	NA	
December 19, 2025	DF	20	(France) Ibrahim Covi	(United States) Spokane Velocity	Contract Expired	NA	
December 19, 2025	MF	21	(Dominican Republic) Derek Cuevas	(Spain) CF Vilanova	Contract Expired	NA	
December 19, 2025	MF	24	(Argentina) Facundo Canete	(United States) Monterey Bay FC	Transfer	Undisclosed	
December 19, 2025	MF	26	(France) Paul Baptiste Behe Leonardi	"Unattached"	Contract Expired	NA	
December 19, 2025	FW	28	(Argentina) Federico Stachuk	"Unattached"	Contract Expired	NA	
December 19, 2025	MF	29	(Colombia) Santiago Cambindo	"Unattached"	Contract Expired	NA	
December 19, 2025	GK	31	(United States) Robert Bailey	"Unattached"	Contract Expired	NA	
December 19, 2025	DF	44	(United States) Christian Diaz	"Unattached"	Contract Expired	NA	
December 19, 2025	MF	77	(Chile) Jonathan Bazaes	"Unattached"	Contract Expired	NA	
December 19, 2025	MF	99	(Liberia) Aryeh Miller	"Unattached"	Contract Expired	NA	

=== Loan In ===
No.	Pos.	Player	Loaned from	Start	End	Source

=== Loan Out ===
No.	Pos.	Player	Loaned from	Start	End	Source

== Non-competitive fixtures ==
=== Preseason ===
January 31	Charleston Battery	Cancelled	Carolina Core FC	Mount Pleasant, South Carolina
				Stadium: Patriots Point Soccer Complex; Attendance: Behind Closed Doors

February 14	Carolina Core FC	v	FC Cincinnati 2	High Point, North Carolina
1:00 PM EDT				Stadium: Truist Point

February 17	Carolina Core FC	1–0	Inter Miami CF II	High Point, North Carolina
6:30 PM EDT				Stadium: Truist Point

February 22	Carolina Core FC	0–3	Crown Legacy FC	High Point, North Carolina
3:00 PM EDT				Stadium: Truist Point

== Competitive fixtures ==
=== Standings ===
Pos	Div	Team	Pld	W	SOW	SOL	L	GF	GA	GD	Pts
12	NE	Toronto FC II (E)	27	11	2	2	12	47	53	−6	39
13	SE	Chicago Fire FC II (E)	27	10	3	3	11	50	47	+3	39
14	SE	Carolina Core FC (E)	27	5	5	5	12	39	52	−13	30
15	NE	FC Cincinnati 2 (E)	27	5	2	1	19	31	60	−29	20
16	SE	Inter Miami CF II (E)	27	3	1	4	19	28	67	−39	15

Updated to match(es) played on September 13, 2026. Source: MLSNP
Rules for classification: 1) Points; 2) Total regulation wins; 3) Total goal differential; 4) Total goals scored; 5) Total shootout wins; 6) Away goal differential; 7) Away goals scored; 8) Home goals differential; 9) Home goals scored; 10) Fewer disciplinary points; 11) Drawing of lots.
(E) Eliminated

=== Overall table ===
Pos	Div	Team	Pld	W	SOW	SOL	L	GF	GA	GD	Pts	Awards
1	FR	Austin FC II (C)	27	18	2	4	3	52	21	+31	62	Regular season champion
2	PC	Portland Timbers 2	27	14	5	4	4	36	28	+8	56	
3	SE	Crown Legacy FC	27	14	5	3	5	65	38	+27	55	
4	PC	Ventura County FC	27	14	4	3	6	57	34	+23	53	
5	SE	Chattanooga FC	27	14	4	3	6	55	39	+16	53	
6	FR	Houston Dynamo 2	27	14	4	2	7	51	30	+21	52	
7	NE	New York Red Bulls II	27	13	2	3	9	57	46	+11	46	
8	NE	Columbus Crew 2	27	12	4	2	9	48	42	+6	46	
9	SE	Atlanta United 2	27	13	1	4	9	58	44	+14	45	
10	NE	New York City FC II	27	13	2	2	10	49	43	+6	45	
11	PC	Los Angeles FC 2	27	11	3	6	7	48	45	+3	45	
12	NE	New England Revolution II	27	11	4	4	8	44	41	+3	45	
13	SE	Orlando City B	27	11	4	3	9	53	52	+1	44	
14	FR	St. Louis City 2	27	10	4	6	7	42	38	+4	44	
15	NE	CT United FC	27	13	2	0	12	52	50	+2	43	
16	NE	Philadelphia Union II	27	12	2	2	11	36	39	−3	42	
17	FR	Minnesota United FC 2	27	11	3	3	10	40	37	+3	42	
18	SE	Huntsville City FC	27	11	2	4	10	47	46	+1	41	
19	FR	North Texas SC	27	8	6	4	9	41	39	+2	40	
20	PC	Tacoma Defiance	27	11	2	2	12	39	43	−4	39	
21	NE	Toronto FC II	27	11	2	2	12	47	53	−6	39	
22	PC	San Jose Earthquakes II	27	10	3	3	11	49	36	+13	39	
23	SE	Chicago Fire FC II	27	10	3	3	11	50	47	+3	39	
24	PC	Real Monarchs	27	7	4	1	15	36	54	−18	30	
25	SE	Carolina Core FC	27	5	5	5	12	39	52	−13	30	
26	PC	Whitecaps FC 2	27	6	4	1	16	39	60	−21	27	
27	NE	FC Cincinnati 2	27	5	2	1	19	31	60	−29	20	
28	FR	Sporting Kansas City II	27	5	1	3	18	33	73	−40	20	
29	FR	Colorado Rapids 2	27	3	2	5	17	26	51	−25	18	
30	SE	Inter Miami CF II	27	3	1	4	19	28	67	−39	15	

Updated to match(es) played on September 16, 2026. Source: MLSNP
Rules for classification: 1) Points; 2) Total regulation wins; 3) Total goal differential; 4) Total goals scored; 5) Total shootout wins; 6) Away goal differential; 7) Away goals scored; 8) Home goals differential; 9) Home goals scored; 10) Fewer disciplinary points; 11) Drawing of lots.
(C) Champion

=== MLS Next Pro Regular Season ===
February 28 1	NYCFC II	P–P	Carolina Core FC	Queens, New York City, New York
7:00 PM EDT				Stadium: Belson Stadium

March 8 1	Atlanta United 2	2–1	Carolina Core FC	Athens, Georgia
7:00 PM EDT	Togashi 32'; Majub (yellow card) 37'; Torres (yellow card) 45+1'; Chica 62'; Suarez-Couri (yellow card) 90+1'; Hibbert (yellow card) 90+2'	Report	Orbaugh (yellow card) 25'; Pineda (yellow card) 34'; Senanou 46' (o.g.); Zeegers (yellow card) 76'; Sumo Jr. (yellow card) 80'	Stadium: Turner Soccer Complex; Referee: Luis Diego Arroyo

March 14 2	Carolina Core FC	2–3	Orlando City B	High Point, North Carolina
3:00 PM EDT	Sumo Jr. (yellow card) 23' (goal) 31'; Montenegro 48'; Zerkane (yellow card) 51'; Diakite (yellow card) 83'; John (yellow card) 90'; Caiza (yellow card) 90+4'	Report	Sarajian 75'; Ellis 80'; Trombino 90+5'	Stadium: Truist Point; Attendance: 4,016; Referee: Lauren Aldrich

March 22 3	Chicago Fire FC II	0–0 (5–4 p)	Carolina Core FC	Bridgeview, Illinois
4:00 PM EDT		Report	Sumo Jr. (yellow card) 56'	Stadium: SeatGeek Stadium; Referee: Igor Bych
	Penalties
	Borso (penalty scored); Fleming (penalty scored); Poreba (penalty scored); Boltz (penalty scored); Pineda (penalty scored)		(penalty scored) Sumo Jr.; (penalty missed) Diaz; (penalty scored) Diakite; (penalty scored) Caiza; (penalty scored) Aguirre

March 28 4	Carolina Core FC	1–1 (0–2 p)	Inter Miami CF II	High Point, North Carolina
3:00 PM EDT	Zeegers (yellow card) 51'; Raimbault 85'; Evers (yellow card) 90'	Report	Ristano (yellow card) 27'; Zeltzer-Zubida 36'; Garcia (yellow card) 58'; Rey (yellow card) 67'; Matos (yellow card) 87'; Vorenkamp (yellow card) 90+5'	Stadium: Truist Point; Referee: Stephen Foster
	Penalties
	Sumo Jr. (penalty missed); Evers (penalty missed); Diakite (penalty missed); Caiza (penalty missed)		(penalty scored) Rey; (penalty missed) Matos; (penalty scored) Perez

April 12 5	Philadelphia Union II	4–1	Carolina Core FC	Chester, Pennsylvania
3:OO PM EDT	Jakupovic 20'; Korzeniowski 25', 30' (yellow card) 87'; De Paula (yellow card) 32'; Uzcátegui 63'	Report	Orbaugh (yellow card) 12'; Raimbault (yellow card) 33'; Caiza (yellow card) 51'; Alenga (yellow card) 68'; Tattevin (yellow card) 75' (goal) 77'	Stadium: Subaru Park; Referee: Izlen Peksenar

April 19 6	Orlando City B	2–2 (6–5 p)	Carolina Core FC	Kissimmee, Florida
7:00 PM EDT	Caraballo 7' (pen.) (yellow card) 64'; Leão 32'; Judelson (yellow card) 54'; Rhein (yellow card) 77'	Report	Raimbault (yellow card) 45+1'; Diaz (yellow card) 62' (goal) 72'; Evers 75'	Stadium: Osceola Heritage Park; Referee: Abdou Ndiaye
	Penalties
	Penders (penalty scored); Yearwood (penalty scored); Trombino (penalty scored); Kendall (penalty scored); Torres (penalty scored); Sandy (penalty scored)		(penalty scored) Zeegers; (penalty scored) Yepes; (penalty scored) Caiza; (penalty scored) Sumo Jr.; (penalty scored) Diakite; (penalty missed) John

April 25 7	Carolina Core FC	2–2 (4–2 p)	Crown Legacy FC	High Point, North Carolina
6:00 PM EDT	Alenga (yellow card) 21'; Caiza (yellow card) 22'; Zerkane (yellow card) 26'; Martinez (yellow card) 35'; Tattevin 45+5', 50'; Diakite (yellow card) 70'	Report	Longo (yellow card) 10'; Johnson 13'; Mbongue 54' (pen.)	Stadium: Truist Point; Referee: Shawn Tehini
	Penalties
	Zeegers (penalty scored); Diaz (penalty scored); Balogun (penalty missed); Montenegro (penalty scored); Diakite (penalty scored)		(penalty scored) Mbongue; (penalty scored) Peña; (penalty missed) Berchimas; (penalty missed) Subotić

May 2 8	Carolina Core FC	1–2	Atlanta United 2	High Point, North Carolina
6:00 PM EDT	Zeegers (yellow card) 53'; Sumo Jr. 57'; Balogun (yellow card) 78'	Report	Dunbar 29', 45+2'; Senanou (yellow card) 41'; Cisset (yellow card) 54'; Torres (yellow card) 79'	Stadium: Truist Point; Referee: Laadi Issaka

May 7 9	Huntsville City FC	3–0	Carolina Core FC	Huntsville, Alabama
8:00 PM EDT	Ekk 28'; Sullivan 79'; Véliz 90+3'	Report	Evers (yellow card) 23' (yellow-red card) 57'; Diakite (yellow card) 32'	Stadium: Wicks Family Field at Joe Davis Stadium; Referee: Amin Hadzic

May 16 10	Carolina Core FC	2–1	Chicago Fire FC II	High Point, North Carolina
6:00 PM EDT	Zerkane (yellow card) 32'; Zeegers 49'; Diakite 54'; Caiza (red card) 57'; Holliday (yellow card) 90+7'	Report	Hyte 40' (yellow card) 82'; Berg (yellow card) 45+1'	Stadium: Truist Point; Referee: Izlen Peksenar

May 24 11	Chattanooga FC	1–0	Carolina Core FC	Chattanooga, Tennessee
3:00 PM EDT	Hanchard (yellow card) 16'; Krehl 59'; Sar-Sar (yellow card) 75'	Report	Montenegro (yellow card) 37'	Stadium: Finley Stadium; Referee: Kaitlyn Trowbridge

May 30 12	Carolina Core FC	1–1 (5–6 p)	Red Bull New York II	High Point, North Carolina
6:00 PM EDT	Martinez (yellow card) 5'; Pineda 29'	Report	Rodriguez 12'; Sánchez (yellow card) 33'	Stadium: Truist Point; Referee: Cuauhtemoc Delgadillo
	Penalties
	Lundeen (penalty scored); Diaz (penalty scored); Sumo Jr. (penalty scored); Rockhill (penalty scored); Tattevin (penalty missed); Evers (penalty scored); Colon (penalty missed)		(penalty scored) Worth; (penalty missed) Sánchez; (penalty scored) Cadigan; (penalty scored) Baitinger; (penalty scored) Rodriguez; (penalty scored) Gallagher; (penalty scored) Modelo

June 7 13	Orlando City B	3–2	Carolina Core FC	Kissimmee, Florida
7:00 PM EDT	Leão 45+5', 74'; Okonski (yellow card) 60'; Belgodere 83'	Report	Tattevin 10'; Pineda 42'; Caiza (red card) 45+3'; Zeegers (yellow card) 45+7'	Stadium: Osceola Heritage Park; Referee: Marie Durr

June 13 14	Carolina Core FC	2–0	Crown Legacy FC	High Point, North Carolina
3:00 PM EDT	Tattevin 43', 51'; Czech (yellow card) 48'; Diaz (yellow card) 57'; Baer (yellow card) 66'	Report	Holt (yellow card) 38'; Ouedraogo (yellow card) 53'; Coulibaly (yellow card) 69' (yellow-red card) 76'; Mendoza (yellow card) 72'	Stadium: Truist Point; Referee: Danielle Chesky

June 17 15	NYCFC II	3–2	Carolina Core FC	Queens, New York City, New York
7:00 PM EDT	Flax 21', 78' (pen.); Samb (yellow card) 23'; De Pinho 73' (yellow card) 85'	Report	Tattevin (yellow card) 59'; Czech 82'; Evers (yellow card) 87'; Diaz 90+2'	Stadium: Belson Stadium; Referee: Drew Klemp

June 20 16	Inter Miami CF II	0–0 (1–4 p)	Carolina Core FC	Fort Lauderdale, Florida
32:00 PM EDT	Saja (yellow card) 30'; Rey (yellow card) 66'; Urkidi (yellow card) 79'	Report	Lundeen (yellow card) 90+2'	Stadium: Baptist Health Community Field; Referee: Edson Carvajal
	Penalties
	Sumalla (penalty scored); Urkidi (penalty missed); Hall (penalty missed)		(penalty scored) Lundeen; (penalty scored) Diaz; (penalty scored) Sumo Jr.; (penalty scored) Caiza

June 28 17	Carolina Core FC	1–0	Huntsville City FC	High Point, North Carolina
6:00 PM EDT	Raimbault 44'	Report	Coulibaly (yellow card) 26'; Devan (yellow card) 71'	Stadium: Truist Point; Referee: JC Griggs

July 5 18	CT United FC	3–1	Carolina Core FC	New Haven, Connecticut
6:00 PM EDT	Tanyi 14'; Petrie (yellow card) 36'; Stephenson (yellow card) 45+2'; Kouonang 50'; D’Ippolito 54'; Applewhaite (yellow card) 86'	Report	Baer (yellow card) 20'; Orbaugh (yellow card) 41'; Tattevin 45+5'; Swineheart (yellow card) 89'; Balogun (yellow card) 90+7'	Stadium: Reese Stadium; Referee: Russell Miller

July 12 19	Carolina Core FC	1–1 (2–4 p)	Chattanooga FC	High Point, North Carolina
5:00 PM EDT	Montenegro (yellow card) 27'; Tattevin 61' (pen.); Lundeen (yellow card) 90+4'	Report	Krehl 45'; Louis-Jean (yellow card) 45+5'	Stadium: Truist Point; Referee: Calin Radosav
	Penalties
	Lundeen (penalty missed); Raimbault (penalty scored); Baer (penalty scored); Caiza (penalty missed)		(penalty scored) Robertson; (penalty scored) Cohen; (penalty scored) Garcia; (penalty scored) Husakiwsky

July 22 20	Carolina Core FC	4–0	Inter Miami CF II	High Point, North Carolina
6:30 PM EDT	Raimbault 3'; Kaloukian 26' (pen.); Diaz 67'; Hammond (yellow card) 78'; Rockhill 88'	Report	Marin (yellow card) 26'; Almeida (yellow card) 90+1'	Stadium: Truist Point; Referee: Danielle Chesky

July 25 21	Carolina Core FC	1–5	Chicago Fire FC II	High Point, North Carolina
7:30 PM EDT	Baer (yellow card) 55'; Tattevin 80'; Orbaugh (yellow card) 82'; Martinez (yellow card) 90'	Report	Nigg (yellow card) 4' (goal) 29'; Pineda 18' (yellow card) 78'; Hlyut 34'; Fleming 48'; González (yellow card) 79'; Diawara 90+1'	Stadium: Truist Point; Referee: Daniel Emeri

July 31 22	Atlanta United 2	3–3 (9–10 p)	Carolina Core FC	Marietta, Georgia
4:00 PM EDT	Dunbar 4'; Chong Qui 19'; Dovlo 44'	Report	Diaz (yellow card) 24'; Tattevin 38' (pen.), 45+1', 50'; Evers (yellow card) 87'	Stadium: Children’s Healthcare of Atlanta Training Ground; Referee: William Hale
	Penalties
	Cisset (penalty scored); Chong Qui (penalty scored); Weah (penalty scored); Riveras (penalty scored); Chica (penalty scored); Senanou (penalty scored); Fakiyesi (penalty scored); Browne (penalty scored); Jardines (penalty scored); Henry (penalty missed)		(penalty scored) Baers; (penalty scored) Diaz; (penalty scored) Evers; (penalty scored) Pineda; (penalty scored) Lundeen; (penalty scored) B. Ford; (penalty scored) G. Ford; (penalty scored) Tetteh; (penalty scored) Montenegro; (penalty scored) Swineheart

August 8 23	Carolina Core FC	2–0	Huntsville City FC	High Point, North Carolina
8:21 PM EDT	Orbaugh 5' (yellow card) 33'; Raimbault 44'; Kaloikian (yellow card) 90+1'	Report	Caicedo (yellow card) 11'; Prince (yellow card) 78' (yellow-red card) 90'	Stadium: Truist Point; Referee: Dorian Del Toro

August 22 24	Carolina Core FC	1–3	FC Cincinnati 2	High Point, North Carolina
7:00 PM ET	Pineda 82'	Report	Lachekar 52'; Samson (yellow card) 63'; Chirilă 66' (pen.); Gray 79'; Paz (yellow card) 85'	Stadium: Truist Point; Referee: Promise Adebayo-Ige

August 29 25	Chattanooga FC	5–2	Carolina Core FC	Chattanooga, Tennessee
7:00 PM EDT	Krehl 11', 47', 62' (yellow card) 63'; Jones 51'; Tcheuyap (yellow card) 61'; Robertson 68'	Report	Czech (yellow card) 16'; Martinez (yellow card) 65'; Orbaugh 74'; Diaz 82'; Lundeen (yellow card) 90+2'	Stadium: Finley Stadium; Attendance: 3,047; Referee: Braeden Frey

September 4 26	Carolina Core FC	2–2 (4–2 p)	New England Revolution II	High Point, North Carolina
6:30 PM EDT	Raimbault (yellow card) 66'; Swineheart 71' (yellow card) 75'; Baer (yellow card) 78'; Hammond 90+2'	Report	Oliveira (yellow card) 39'; Zambrano 83', 87'; Sasaki (yellow card) 90+6'	Stadium: Truist Point; Attendance: 4,483; Referee: Stefan Perri
	Penalties
	Baer (penalty scored); Diaz (penalty scored); Kaloukian (penalty scored); Raimbault (penalty missed); Ford (penalty scored)		(penalty missed) Zambrano; (penalty missed) Shannon; (penalty scored) Mussenden; (penalty scored) Baptiste

September 12 27	Crown Legacy FC	2–2 (3–4 p)	Carolina Core FC	Matthews, North Carolina
7:00 PM EDT	Romero 28'; Smalls 32'; Subotić (yellow card) 56'	Report	Raimbault 47' (yellow card) 74'; Baer (yellow card) 77'; Orbaugh (yellow card) 84'; Stewart 88'	Stadium: Sportsplex at Matthews; Referee: MJ Tehini
	Penalties
	Ventura (penalty scored); Mbongue (penalty scored); Barnett (penalty missed); Blama (penalty missed); Mendoza (penalty scored)		(penalty missed) Baer; (penalty scored) Lundeen; (penalty scored) Czech; (penalty scored) B. Ford; (penalty scored) Orbaugh

September 20 28	Columbus Crew 2	1–1 (5–4 p)	Carolina Core FC	Columbus, Ohio
2:00 PM EDT	Aoki (yellow card) 16'; Chirinos 53'; Lloyd (red card) 63'	Report	Montenegro 25'	Stadium: ScottsMiracle-Gro Field; Referee: Salvador Flores
	Penalties
	Adu-Gyamfi (penalty scored); Danjaji (penalty scored); Rincón (penalty scored); Gbamblé (penalty scored); Brown (penalty scored)		(penalty missed) Baer; (penalty scored) Diaz; (penalty scored) Lundeen; (penalty scored) Aguirre; (penalty scored) B. Ford

==== Lamar Hunt US Open Cup ====
March 19 First Round	Carolina Core FC	1–2	Virginia Dream FC	High Point, North Carolina
6:00 PM ET	Yepes (yellow card) 27'; Aguirre (yellow card) 42'; Zeegers 52'; Brown (yellow card) 62'; Montenegro (yellow card) 64'; Ibarra (yellow card) 71'; Balogun (yellow card) 76'		Amo (yellow card) 6'; Diarra 58'; Akinkoye 78'; Guerrero (yellow card) 90+5'	Stadium: Truist Point; Attendance: 1,091; Referee: Yannick Rothfuss

== Statistics ==
=== Appearances and goals ===
No.	Pos	Nat	Player	Total		MLS Next Pro		U.S. Open Cup		MLSNP Playoffs	
No.	Pos	Nat	Player	Apps	Goals	Apps	Goals	Apps	Goals	Apps	Goals
1	GK	(United States) USA	Nick Holliday	21	0	20+0	0	1+0	0	0+0	0
2	DF	(United States) USA	Charles Orbaugh	24	2	21+3	2	0+0	0	0+0	0
3	DF	(Colombia) COL	Santiago Yepes	9	0	6+2	0	1+0	0	0+0	0
4	DF	(United States) USA	Nolan Evers	23	1	17+5	1	1+0	0	0+0	0
5	MF	(Algeria) ALG	Mehdi Zerkane	7	0	6+1	0	0+0	0	0+0	0
6	MF	(United States) USA	Ricardo Montenegro	29	1	24+4	1	1+0	0	0+0	0
7	MF	(Netherlands) NED	Tim Zeegers	16	2	12+3	1	1+0	1	0+0	0
8	MF	(United States) USA	Corey Lundeen	16	0	3+13	0	0+0	0	0+0	0
9	FW	(Armenia) ARM	Nicholas Kaloukian	8	1	8+0	1	0+0	0	0+0	0
10	FW	(United States) USA	Jesus Ibarra	4	0	1+2	0	0+1	0	0+0	0
11	FW	(Liberia) LBR	Anthony Sumo Jr.	17	2	9+7	2	1+0	0	0+0	0
12	MF	(Tanzania) TAN	Charles Alenga	7	0	4+3	0	0+0	0	0+0	0
14	MF	(United States) USA	Khalid Balogun	9	0	2+6	0	0+1	0	0+0	0
15	FW	(United States) USA	Antonio Pineda	13	3	8+5	3	0+0	0	0+0	0
16	MF	(Ivory Coast) CIV	Mohamed Diakite	11	1	4+7	1	0+0	0	0+0	0
17	MF	(Ecuador) ECU	Jair Caiza	18	0	16+1	0	0+1	0	0+0	0
18	DF	(United States) USA	Dominique Colon	10	0	2+7	0	1+0	0	0+0	0
19	MF	(United States) USA	Seth Hammond	15	1	10+5	1	0+0	0	0+0	0
20	MF	(New Zealand) NZL	Thomas Raimbault	28	5	22+5	5	1+0	0	0+0	0
21	DF	(United States) USA	Nelson Martinez	16	0	11+5	0	0+0	0	0+0	0
22	DF	(United States) USA	Nathan Brown	7	0	1+5	0	1+0	0	0+0	0
23	MF	(El Salvador) ESA	Robinson Aguirre	8	0	3+4	0	1+0	0	0+0	0
24	MF	(United States) USA	Tristan Weber	8	0	5+3	0	0+0	0	0+0	0
25	DF	(United States) USA	Bryce Swineheart	9	1	9+0	1	0+0	0	0+0	0
26	FW	(Central African Republic) CAF	Arnaud Tattevin	22	12	20+2	12	0+0	0	0+0	0
27	MF	(United States) USA	Andrew Czech	11	1	10+1	1	0+0	0	0+0	0
33	DF	(United States) USA	Bodie Ford	9	0	5+4	0	0+0	0	0+0	0
43	FW	(United States) USA	Jay Stewart	2	1	0+2	1	0+0	0	0+0	0
44	GK	(United States) USA	Trevor Jackson	4	0	4+0	0	0+0	0	0+0	0
50	MF	(United States) USA	Valentino Ontiveros	1	0	0+1	0	0+0	0	0+0	0
55	DF	(United States) USA	Graham Ford	9	0	4+5	0	0+0	0	0+0	0
58	MF	(United States) USA	David Diaz	28	4	14+13	4	0+1	0	0+0	0
77	DF	(Ghana) GHA	Rashid Tetteh	8	0	5+3	0	0+0	0	0+0	0
80	MF	(Jamaica) JAM	Dyllan John	9	0	4+4	0	1+0	0	0+0	0
88	MF	(United States) USA	Ryan Baer	15	0	13+2	0	0+0	0	0+0	0
90	GK	(United States) USA	Nolan Anderson	4	0	4+0	0	0+0	0	0+0	0
99	DF	(United States) USA	Grayson Rockhill	3	1	0+3	1	0+0	0	0+0	0

- Last updated: September 20, 2026
- Source: https://www.mlsnextpro.com/clubs/carolina-core-fc/stats/#season=MLS-SEA-0001K9&competition=mls-next-pro&club=MLS-CLU-00003I&statType=general&position=all

=== Top scorers ===
Rank	Position	Number	Name	MLS Next Pro	U.S. Open Cup	MLSNP Playoffs	Total
1	FW	26	(Central African Republic) Arnaud Tattevin	12	0	0	12
2	MF	20	(New Zealand) Thomas Raimbault	5	0	0	5
3	FW	58	(United States) David Diaz	4	0	0	4
4	FW	15	(United States) Antonio Pineda	3	0	0	3
5	DF	2	(United States) Charles Orbaugh	2	0	0	2
5	MF	6	(United States) Ricardo Montenegro	2	0	0	2
5	FW	11	(Liberia) Anthony Sumo Jr.	2	0	0	2
5	MF	7	(Netherlands) Tim Zeegers	1	1	0	2
8	DF	4	(United States) Nolan Evers	1	0	0	1
8	FW	9	(Armenia) Nicholas Kaloukian	1	0	0	1
8	MF	16	(Ivory Coast) Mohamed Diakite	1	0	0	1
8	MF	19	(United States) Seth Hammond	1	0	0	1
8	DF	25	(United States) Bryce Swineheart	1	0	0	1
8	MF	27	(United States) Andrew Czech	1	0	0	1
8	FW	43	(United States) Jay Stewart	1	0	0	1
8	DF	99	(United States) Grayson Rockhill	1	0	0	1
8	NA	NA	Own Goals	1	0	0	1
Total				40	1	0	41

- Last updated: September 20, 2026
- Source: https://www.mlsnextpro.com/clubs/carolina-core-fc/stats/#season=MLS-SEA-0001K9&competition=mls-next-pro&club=MLS-CLU-00003I&statType=general&position=all

=== Top assists ===
Rank	Position	Number	Name	MLS Next Pro	U.S. Open Cup	MLSNP Playoffs	Total
1	MF	20	(New Zealand) Thomas Raimbault	6	0	0	6
2	MF	6	(United States) Ricardo Montenegro	4	1	0	5
3	DF	2	(United States) Charles Orbaugh	3	0	0	3
3	DF	33	(United States) Bodie Ford	3	0	0	3
5	FW	9	(Armenia) Nicholas Kaloukian	2	0	0	2
5	FW	15	(United States) Antonio Pineda	2	0	0	2
5	MF	19	(United States) Seth Hammond	2	0	0	2
5	MF	20	(United States) Corey Lundeen	2	0	0	2
5	FW	58	(United States) David Diaz	2	0	0	2
10	MF	5	(Algeria) Mehdi Zerkane	1	0	0	1
10	DF	22	(United States) Nathan Brown	1	0	0	1
10	MF	24	(United States) Tristan Weber	1	0	0	1
Total				29	1	0	30

- Last updated: September 20, 2026
- Source: https://www.mlsnextpro.com/clubs/carolina-core-fc/stats/#season=MLS-SEA-0001K9&competition=mls-next-pro&club=MLS-CLU-00003I&statType=general&position=all

=== Disciplinary record ===
No.	Pos.	Player	MLS Next Pro			U.S. Open Cup			MLSNP Playoffs			Total		
No.	Pos.	Player	Booked	(yellow card) (yellow-red card)	Sent off (straight red)	Booked	(yellow card) (yellow-red card)	Sent off (straight red)	Booked	(yellow card) (yellow-red card)	Sent off (straight red)	Booked	(yellow card) (yellow-red card)	Sent off (straight red)
1	GK	(United States) Nick Holliday	1	0	0	0	0	0	0	0	0	1	0	0
2	DF	(United States) Charles Orbaugh	6	0	0	0	0	0	0	0	0	6	0	0
3	DF	(Colombia) Santiago Yepes	0	0	0	1	0	0	0	0	0	1	0	0
4	DF	(United States) Nolan Evers	4	1	0	0	0	0	0	0	0	4	1	0
5	MF	(Algeria) Mehdi Zerkane	3	0	0	0	0	0	0	0	0	3	0	0
6	MF	(United States) Ricardo Montenegro	2	0	0	1	0	0	0	0	0	3	0	0
7	MF	(Netherlands) Tim Zeegers	4	0	0	0	0	0	0	0	0	4	0	0
8	MF	(United States) Corey Lundeen	3	0	0	0	0	0	0	0	0	3	0	0
9	FW	(Armenia) Nicholas Kaloukian	1	0	0	0	0	0	0	0	0	1	0	0
10	FW	(United States) Jesus Ibarra	0	0	0	1	0	0	0	0	0	1	0	0
11	FW	(Liberia) Anthony Sumo Jr.	4	0	0	0	0	0	0	0	0	4	0	0
12	MF	(Tanzania) Charles Alenga	2	0	0	0	0	0	0	0	0	2	0	0
14	MF	(United States) Khalid Balogun	2	0	0	1	0	0	0	0	0	3	0	0
15	FW	(United States) Antonio Pineda	1	0	0	0	0	0	0	0	0	1	0	0
16	MF	(Ivory Coast) Mohamed Diakite	3	0	0	0	0	0	0	0	0	3	0	0
17	MF	(Ecuador) Jair Caiza	3	0	2	0	0	0	0	0	0	3	0	2
18	DF	(United States) Dominique Colon	0	0	0	0	0	0	0	0	0	0	0	0
19	MF	(United States) Seth Hammond	1	0	0	0	0	0	0	0	0	1	0	0
20	MF	(New Zealand) Thomas Raimbault	4	0	0	0	0	0	0	0	0	4	0	0
21	DF	(United States) Nelson Martinez	4	0	0	0	0	0	0	0	0	4	0	0
22	DF	(United States) Nathan Brown	0	0	0	1	0	0	0	0	0	1	0	0
23	MF	(El Salvador) Robinson Aguirre	0	0	0	1	0	0	0	0	0	1	0	0
24	MF	(United States) Tristan Weber	0	0	0	0	0	0	0	0	0	0	0	0
25	DF	(United States) Bryce Swineheart	2	0	0	0	0	0	0	0	0	2	0	0
26	FW	(Central African Republic) Arnaud Tattevin	2	0	0	0	0	0	0	0	0	2	0	0
27	MF	(United States) Andrew Czech	2	0	0	0	0	0	0	0	0	2	0	0
33	DF	(United States) Bodie Ford	0	0	0	0	0	0	0	0	0	0	0	0
44	GK	(United States) Trevor Jackson	0	0	0	0	0	0	0	0	0	0	0	0
55	DF	(United States) Graham Ford	0	0	0	0	0	0	0	0	0	0	0	0
58	MF	(United States) David Diaz	3	0	0	0	0	0	0	0	0	3	0	0
77	DF	(Ghana) Rashid Tetteh	0	0	0	0	0	0	0	0	0	0	0	0
80	MF	(Jamaica) Dyllan John	1	0	0	0	0	0	0	0	0	1	0	0
88	MF	(United States) Ryan Baer	5	0	0	0	0	0	0	0	0	5	0	0
90	GK	(United States) Nolan Anderson	0	0	0	0	0	0	0	0	0	0	0	0
99	DF	(United States) Grayson Rockhill	0	0	0	0	0	0	0	0	0	0	0	0
Total			63	1	2	6	0	0	0	0	0	69	1	2

- Last updated: September 12, 2026
- Source: https://www.mlsnextpro.com/clubs/carolina-core-fc/stats/#season=MLS-SEA-0001K9&competition=mls-next-pro&club=MLS-CLU-00003I&statType=general&position=all

== Awards and Honors ==
=== MLS NEXT Player of the Month ===
Player	Month	Reference
(Central African Republic) Arnaud Tattevin	July	

=== MLS NEXT Player of the Matchweek ===
Player	Matchweek	Reference
(Central African Republic) Arnaud Tattevin	16	
(Central African Republic) Arnaud Tattevin	22	

=== MLS NEXT Pro Goal of the Matchweek ===
Player	Matchweek	Reference
(Liberia) Anthony Sumo Jr.	9	
(United States) David Diaz	26	
