= 2022–23 MVV Maastricht season =

MVV Maastricht
2022–23 season
- Chairman: Bert Kersten
- Manager: Maurice Verberne
- Stadium: De Geusselt
- Eerste Divisie: 5th
- KNVB Cup: First round

The 2022–23 season was the 121st season in the history of MVV Maastricht and their 23rd consecutive season in the second division of Dutch football. The club participated in the Eerste Divisie and the KNVB Cup. The season covered the period from 1 July 2022 to 30 June 2023.

== Players ==
As of 10 February 2023

Note: Flags indicate national team as defined under FIFA eligibility rules; some limited exceptions apply. Players may hold more than one non-FIFA nationality.

No.	Pos.	Nation	Player
1	GK	BEL	Thijs Lambrix
2	DF	BEL	Rein Van Helden (on loan from Sint-Truiden)
3	DF	NED	Rico Zeegers
4	DF	BEL	Matteo Waem (captain)
5	DF	NED	Lars Schenk
6	DF	NED	Clint Essers
7	FW	NED	Sven Blummel
8	MF	NED	Nicky Souren
9	FW	NED	Mart Remans
10	FW	NED	Koen Kostons
11	MF	NED	Orhan Džepar
12	GK	BEL	Romain Matthys
14	FW	NED	Ruben van Bommel

No.	Pos.	Nation	Player
15	MF	BEL	Lorenzo Noviello
16	MF	BEL	Jarne Steuckers (on loan from Sint-Truiden)
17	MF	NED	Thomas van Bommel
21	MF	BEL	Leroy Labylle
22	FW	NED	Dailon Livramento
23	GK	BEL	Logan Ancion
24	MF	NED	Saul Penders
27	MF	NED	Rayan El Azrak
28	MF	NED	Jimmy Vijgen
30	MF	BEL	Nabil El Basri
31	MF	NED	Marko Kleinen
32	DF	NED	Tim Zeegers

== Pre-season and friendlies ==
Win Draw Loss

25 June 2022 Friendly	Berg (Germany)	0–16	(Netherlands) MVV Maastricht
CEST (UTC+2)

9 July 2022 Friendly	Meerssen (Netherlands)	0–0	(Netherlands) MVV Maastricht
CEST (UTC+2)

== Competitions ==
=== Overall record ===
Competition	First match	Last match	Starting round	Final position	Record							
Competition	First match	Last match	Starting round	Final position	Pld	W	D	L	GF	GA	GD	Win %
Eerste Divisie	5 August 2022	19 May 2023	Matchday 1	5th	38	18	5	15	65	65	+0	47.37
KNVB Cup	19 October 2022		First round	First round	1	0	0	1	1	5	−4	0.00
Total					39	18	5	16	66	70	−4	46.15

Source: Soccerway

=== Eerste Divisie ===
==== League table ====
Pos	Team	Pld	W	D	L	GF	GA	GD	Pts	Promotion or qualification
3	Almere City (Note: Winner of the Third Period (Rounds 20–28)) (O, P)	38	21	7	10	58	41	+17	70	Qualification for promotion play-offs
4	Willem II	38	19	11	8	68	40	+28	68	Qualification for promotion play-offs
5	MVV Maastricht	38	18	5	15	65	65	0	59	Qualification for promotion play-offs
6	NAC Breda	38	18	5	15	64	64	0	59	Qualification for promotion play-offs
7	VVV-Venlo	38	16	10	12	56	51	+5	58	Qualification for promotion play-offs

Source: Soccerway, Keuken Kampioen Divisie (in Dutch)
Rules for classification: Season in progress: 1) Most points won; 2) Less points lost; 3) Goal difference; 4) Goals scored; 5) Alphabetical order; End of season: 1) Points; 2) Goal difference; 3) Goals scored; 4) Head-to-head points; 5) Head-to-head goal difference; 6) Head-to-head away goals scored; 7) Play-off if relevant for deciding champion, relegation or participating in a European league, otherwise by draw. 8) Penalty shoot-out (only after a play-off)
(O) Play-off winners; (P) Promoted

==== Results summary ====
Overall								Home						Away					
Pld	W	D	L	GF	GA	GD	Pts	W	D	L	GF	GA	GD	W	D	L	GF	GA	GD
38	18	5	15	65	65	0	59	13	3	3	42	23	+19	5	2	12	23	42	−19

Source: Keuken Kampioen Divisie

==== Results by round ====
Round	1	2	3	4	5	6	7	8	9	10	11	12	13	14	15	16	17	18	19	20	21	22	23	24	25	26	27	28	29	30	31	32	33	34	35	36	37	38
Ground	A	H	H	A	H	A	H	A	H	A	H	H	A	H	A	H	A	A	H	A	H	A	A	H	A	H	H	A	H	A	H	A	H	A	H	A	H	A
Result	L	W	W	D	D	L	W	W	W	W	D	W	W	W	L	W	L	L	D	L	L	D	L	W	L	W	L	L	W	L	W	W	W	W	L	L	W	L
Position																																						

Source: Keuken Kampioen Divisie
A = Away; H = Home; W = Win; D = Draw; L = Loss

==== Matches ====
The league fixtures were announced on 17 June 2022.
