= Nabil El Basri =

Footballer (born 2004)

Personal information
- Date of birth: 26 March 2004 (age 22)
- Place of birth: Liège, Belgium
- Height: 1.87 m (6 ft 2 in)
- Position: Midfielder

Youth career
- MVV Maastricht

Senior career*
| Years | Team | Apps | (Gls) |
| 2022–2026 | MVV Maastricht | 109 | (9) |

International career^{‡}
| 2023 | Morocco U20 | 2 | (0) |
- * Club domestic league appearances and goals as of 28 April 2026 ‡ National team caps and goals as of 15 June 2023

Nabil El Basri (Arabic: نبيل البصري; born 26 March 2004) is a professional footballer who plays as a midfielder. Born in Belgium, he represents Morocco internationally.

== Career ==
El Basri is a MVV Maastricht youth product. He made his professional debut on 15 August 2022 under head coach Maurice Verberne, replacing goalscorer Koen Kostons in the 78th minute of a 3–1 win in the Eerste Divisie over NAC Breda.

On 29 June 2023, El Basri signed his first professional contract with MVV, keeping him at the club until 2025. He made his first start on 8 September 2023, deputising for suspended captain Nicky Souren in a 2–1 defeat away to Willem II, and provided the assist for Tunahan Taşçı's opener. A week later he scored his first professional goal in a 3–2 loss to FC Den Bosch.

During the 2024–25 season, El Basri became a regular in MVV's midfield, making 37 league appearances and scoring six goals. In April 2025, he extended his contract with the club until 2026.

== International career ==
In June 2023, he took part in the Maurice Revello Tournament in France with Morocco.

== Career statistics ==
As of match played 19 December 2025

Appearances and goals by club, season and competition
| Club | Season | League | | | National cup | | Other | | Total | |
| Club | Season | Division | Apps | Goals | Apps | Goals | Apps | Goals | Apps | Goals |
|---|---|---|---|---|---|---|---|---|---|---|
| MVV | 2022–23 | Eerste Divisie | 9 | 0 | 0 | 0 | 1 (Note: Appearance(s) in Eredivisie promotion/relegation playoffs) | 0 | 10 | 0 |
| MVV | 2023–24 | Eerste Divisie | 36 | 2 | 0 | 0 | — | | 36 | 2 |
| MVV | 2024–25 | Eerste Divisie | 37 | 6 | 2 | 0 | — | | 39 | 6 |
| MVV | 2025–26 | Eerste Divisie | 18 | 0 | 1 | 1 | — | | 19 | 1 |
| Career total | | | 100 | 8 | 3 | 1 | 1 | 0 | 104 | 9 |
