= 2023–24 MVV Maastricht season =

MVV Maastricht
2023–24 season
- Manager: Maurice Verberne
- Stadium: De Geusselt
- Eerste Divisie: 14th
- KNVB Cup: First round
- Average home league attendance: 5,454
Home colours

The 2023–24 season is MVV Maastricht's 122nd season in existence and 24th consecutive in the Eerste Divisie. They will also compete in the KNVB Cup.

== Players ==
=== First-team squad ===
As of 30 August 2023

Note: Flags indicate national team as defined under FIFA eligibility rules; some limited exceptions apply. Players may hold more than one non-FIFA nationality.

No.	Pos.	Nation	Player
1	GK	BEL	Thijs Lambrix
3	DF	NED	Özgür Aktaş
4	DF	BEL	Wout Coomans
5	MF	NED	Bryan Smeets
6	MF	MAR	Nabil El Basri
7	FW	TUR	Tunahan Taşçı (on loan from Fortuna Sittard)
8	MF	NED	Nicky Souren
9	FW	NED	Mart Remans
10	FW	NED	Koen Kostons
11	MF	BEL	Rayan Buifrahi
12	GK	BEL	Romain Matthys
14	MF	NED	Saul Penders
17	FW	NED	Keone Maho

No.	Pos.	Nation	Player
18	MF	BEL	Ferre Slegers
20	DF	NED	Bryant Nieling (on loan from Fortuna Sittard)
21	MF	BEL	Leroy Labylle
22	FW	NED	Dailon Livramento
23	GK	NED	Niels Martens
24	MF	NED	Emre Yetimoglu
27	MF	BEL	Baud Terwingen (on loan from Patro Eisden)
28	MF	ALG	Nabil Bouchentouf
31	MF	NED	Marko Kleinen
32	DF	NED	Tim Zeegers
34	DF	NED	Lars Schenk
39	DF	BEL	Kanou Sy
41	GK	BEL	Brent Stevens

== Transfers ==
=== In ===
Pos.	Player	Transferred from	Fee	Date	Source

=== Out ===
Pos.	Player	Transferred to	Fee	Date	Source

== Pre-season and friendlies ==
Win Draw Loss Fixtures

19 July 2023 Friendly	Meerssen (Netherlands)	0–6	(Netherlands) MVV Maastricht
19:00

29 July 2023 Friendly	MVV Maastricht (Netherlands)	0–0	(Belgium) Patro Eisden
19:00

5 August 2023 Friendly	MVV Maastricht (Netherlands)	1–3	(Belgium) RFC Liège
19:00

== Competitions ==
=== Overall record ===
Competition	First match	Last match	Starting round	Final position	Record							
Competition	First match	Last match	Starting round	Final position	Pld	W	D	L	GF	GA	GD	Win %
Eerste Divisie	13 August 2023	10 May 2024	Matchday 1		29	10	7	12	49	49	+0	34.48
KNVB Cup			First round	First round	1	0	0	1	1	4	−3	0.00
Total					30	10	7	13	50	53	−3	33.33

Last updated: 8 March 2024
Source: Soccerway

=== Eerste Divisie ===
==== League table ====
Pos	Team	Pld	W	D	L	GF	GA	GD	Pts	Promotion or qualification
7	Emmen	38	17	6	15	59	60	−1	57	Qualification for promotion play-offs
8	NAC Breda (O, P)	38	15	11	12	63	56	+7	56	Qualification for promotion play-offs
9	MVV Maastricht	38	16	8	14	64	60	+4	56	
10	Jong AZ	38	16	8	14	62	61	+1	56	Reserve teams are not eligible to be promoted to the Eredivisie
11	Helmond Sport	38	14	9	15	52	55	−3	51	

Source: Flashscore, Keuken Kampioen Divisie (in Dutch)
Rules for classification: Season in progress: 1) Most points won; 2) Less points lost; 3) Goal difference; 4) Goals scored; 5) Alphabetical order; End of season: 1) Points; 2) Goal difference; 3) Goals scored; 4) Head-to-head points; 5) Head-to-head goal difference; 6) Head-to-head away goals scored; 7) Play-off if relevant for deciding champion, relegation or participating in a European league, otherwise by draw. 8) Penalty shoot-out (only after a play-off)
(O) Play-off winners; (P) Promoted

==== Results summary ====
Overall								Home						Away					
Pld	W	D	L	GF	GA	GD	Pts	W	D	L	GF	GA	GD	W	D	L	GF	GA	GD
29	10	7	12	49	49	0	37	5	4	5	26	21	+5	5	3	7	23	28	−5

Last updated: 8 March 2024.

==== Results by round ====
Round	1
Ground	
Result	
Position	

Updated to match(es) played on August 2023. Source:
A = Away; H = Home; W = Win; D = Draw; L = Loss

==== Matches ====
The league fixtures were unveiled on 30 June 2023.

6 November 2023 13	MVV Maastricht	1–1	FC Emmen
20:00
Note: postponed from 3 November.

10 November 2023 14	TOP Oss	0–1	MVV Maastricht
12:15

19 November 2023 15	MVV Maastricht	1–4	NAC Breda
16:45

26 November 2023 16	Roda JC Kerkrade	1–0	Jong AZ Alkmaar
12:15

1 December 2023 17	MVV Maastricht	4–1	Jong AZ Alkmaar
20:00

8 December 2023 18	Helmond Sport	v	MVV Maastricht
20:00

=== KNVB Cup ===
2 November 2023 First round	Cambuur	4–1	MVV Maastricht	Leeuwarden
18:45 CET (UTC+1)				Stadium: Cambuur Stadion
