= Rayan Buifrahi =

Belgian footballer (born 2005)

Personal information
- Full name: Rayan Buifrahi Khbiez
- Date of birth: 13 March 2005 (age 21)
- Place of birth: Brussels, Belgium
- Height: 1.73 m (5 ft 8 in)
- Positions: Winger; attacking midfielder

Team information
- Current team: Eindhoven
- Number: 28

Youth career
- 2010–2012: SC Wolvertem
- 2012–2017: Anderlecht
- 2017–2020: Club Brugge
- 2020–2023: Oostende

Senior career*
Years	Team	Apps	(Gls)
2023–2025	MVV	59	(3)
2025–2026	Club NXT	22	(1)
2026–	Eindhoven	5	(2)

International career
2021	Belgium U15	1	(0)
- * Club domestic league appearances and goals as of 3 October 2026

Rayan Buifrahi Khbiez (Arabic: رايان بويفراحي خبيز, romanized: Rāyān Buifraḥī Khbiez; Berber languages: ⵔⴰⵢⴰⵏ ⴱⵓⵢⴼⵔⴰⵃⵉ ⵅⴱⵉⵣ, romanized: Rayyan Buyefraḥi Xbiz; born 13 March 2005) is a Belgian professional footballer who plays as a winger or attacking midfielder for Eerste Divisie club Eindhoven.

== Club career ==
=== Early years ===
Buifrahi was born in Brussels, Belgium, to Moroccan parents from Tétouan in northern Morocco. He grew up in Wemmel, near Brussels, before moving to Merchtem. His passion for football began early: "I always had a ball at my feet, even in nursery," he recalled. His enthusiasm for the sport was influenced by his father, a dedicated football fan, with whom he often watched matches alongside his grandfather.

Buifrahi's journey into organised football started when a gym teacher recognised his talent in first grade and suggested his parents enroll him at the local club SC Wolvertem. His impressive performance during a match against a youth team from Anderlecht caught the attention of scouts from the club. Though initially hesitant due to his young age, Buifrahi's parents eventually agreed, allowing him to join Anderlecht's youth academy. He remained with Anderlecht until the age of 12, then caught the eye of another esteemed youth academy, Club Brugge. He remained there until his under-16 years when the challenges posed by the COVID-19 pandemic led him to make a move to Oostende.

Buifrahi showcased exceptional talent during the 2022–23 season with his youth team, scoring 25 goals and providing 17 assists. Despite his efforts, he faced challenges making a breakthrough into the struggling first team at that time, which eventually faced relegation from the Belgian Pro League. Buifrahi attributed his inability to debut professionally for Oostende to the complexities of integrating young players into a struggling senior squad. Additionally, he cited internal unrest within the team as a contributing factor that led to his departure following the season.

=== MVV ===
On 2 June 2023, Buifrahi signed with Dutch second-tier Eerste Divisie club MVV, despite receiving offers from "Belgian top clubs", according to MVV's technical director Ronny Van Geneugden. He signed a two-year contract with an option for an additional year.

Buifrahi made his professional debut on the first matchday of the season, starting in a 3–1 win over VVV-Venlo. On 6 October, he recorded his first assist, setting up Mart Remans' 1–1 equaliser in an eventual 3–2 away victory against Jong PSV. He scored his professional goal on 2 November, breaking the deadlock in the 18th minute during MVV's first-round match in the KNVB Cup against Cambuur. Unfortunately, despite his goal, MVV suffered a 4–1 defeat, resulting in their elimination from the tournament.

=== Club NXT ===
On 5 June 2025, Buifrahi returned to Belgium to rejoin his former youth side Club Brugge, signing a two-year deal with their reserve team Club NXT, who compete in the Challenger Pro League.

=== Eindhoven ===
On 2 September 2026, Buifrahi returned to the Netherlands and signed a two-season contract with Eindhoven in the second tier.

== International career ==
Buifrahi holds one cap with the Belgium national under-15 team. While expressing an interest in representing Morocco at the international level in the future, he expressed that he did not rule out the possibility of playing for Belgium as well.

== Style of play ==
Buifrahi has showcased his attacking skills primarily as a winger or attacking midfielder. Despite labeling himself as a slow maturer, a factor that affected his tenure at Club Brugge, he displayed adeptness in scoring goals and providing assists during his youth career. His style has been influenced by prominent figures in football like Cristiano Ronaldo, Neymar, and Eden Hazard, serving as major inspirations in shaping his gameplay.

== Career statistics ==
As of match played 24 September 2025

Appearances and goals by club, season and competition
Club	Season	League			National cup		Other		Total	
Club	Season	Division	Apps	Goals	Apps	Goals	Apps	Goals	Apps	Goals
MVV	2023–24	Eerste Divisie	27	0	1	1	—		28	1
MVV	2024–25	Eerste Divisie	32	3	1	0	—		33	3
MVV	Total		59	3	2	1	—		61	4
Club NXT	2025–26	Challenger Pro League	6	0	—		—		6	0
Career total			65	3	2	1	0	0	67	4
