= Ferre Slegers =

Belgian footballer (born 2004)

Personal information
- Date of birth: 1 December 2004 (age 21)
- Place of birth: Zonhoven, Belgium
- Height: 1.82 m (6 ft 0 in)
- Position: Winger

Team information
- Current team: Beveren
- Number: 8

Youth career
- 2011–2022: Genk
- 2022–2023: Sint-Truiden

Senior career*
Years	Team	Apps	(Gls)
2023–2025	MVV	60	(5)
2025–	Beveren	30	(8)

International career^{‡}
2019	Belgium U15	1	(0)
2019	Belgium U16	2	(3)
2023	Belgium U20	1	(0)
- * Club domestic league appearances and goals as of 29 August 2026 ‡ National team caps and goals as of 21 November 2023

Ferre Slegers (born 1 December 2004) is a Belgian professional footballer who plays as a winger for Challenger Pro League club Beveren.

== Career ==
In 2022, Slegers transitioned from the youth academy of Genk to Sint-Truiden. His swift progress captured the attention of head coach Bernd Hollerbach. Despite Hollerbach's admiration for Slegers, his breakthrough into the first team did not materialize, and the board opted not to renew his contract.

On 20 June 2023, he joined Dutch second-tier Eerste Divisie club MVV, signing a two-year contract with an option for a third. His professional debut for the club's first team came on 13 August 2023. In the opening match of the Eerste Divisie season against VVV-Venlo, ending in a 3–1 victory, Slegers earned a starting position under coach Maurice Verberne. He scored the opening goal shortly after halftime and was substituted in the 72nd minute for Dailon Livramento.

On 8 September 2025, Slegers signed a three-year contract with Challenger Pro League club Beveren, marking his return to Belgium.

== International career ==
Slegers is a Belgium youth international. In November 2023, he received a call-up for the Belgium national under-20 team. He made his debut for the side in a friendly against France U20 on 21 November, replacing Mo Salah in the 86th minute of a 2–2 draw.

== Career statistics ==
As of match played 28 March 2025

Appearances and goals by club, season and competition
Club	Season	League			National cup		Other		Total	
Club	Season	Division	Apps	Goals	Apps	Goals	Apps	Goals	Apps	Goals
MVV	2023–24	Eerste Divisie	33	4	1	0	—		34	4
MVV	2024–25	Eerste Divisie	24	1	1	1	—		25	2
Career total			57	5	2	1	0	0	59	6
