= Saul Penders =

Dutch footballer (born 2003)

Personal information
- Date of birth: 29 March 2003 (age 23)
- Place of birth: Maastricht, Netherlands
- Height: 1.82 m (6 ft 0 in)
- Position: Midfielder

Team information
- Current team: Turkse Rangers
- Number: 46

Youth career
- MVV

Senior career*
Years	Team	Apps	(Gls)
2021–2025	MVV	38	(0)
2025–	Turkse Rangers	4	(0)
- * Club domestic league appearances and goals as of 14:32, 30 September 2025 (UTC)

Saul Penders (born 29 March 2003) is a Dutch professional footballer who plays as a midfielder for Belgian Division 3 club Turkse Rangers.

== Career ==
Penders progressed through the MVV youth academy. He made his professional debut under head coach Klaas Wels on 22 October 2021, replacing Marko Kleinen in the 78th minute of a 3–0 away loss in the Eerste Divisie to NAC Breda. Penders made his first ever start on 29 January 2022 due to injuries and COVID-19 infections in the squad, featuring in midfield in a 1–0 league defeat away to FC Eindhoven.

On 7 July 2022, Penders signed his first professional contract with MVV, a two-year deal keeping him in Maastricht until 2024. He left the club as his contract expired in June 2025.

In September 2025, Penders joined newly promoted Belgian Division 3 club Turkse Rangers.

== Personal life ==
Penders is the son of former MVV player and chief executive, Paul Penders.

== Career statistics ==
As of match played 17 November 2024

Appearances and goals by club, season and competition
Club	Season	League			National cup		Other		Total	
Club	Season	Division	Apps	Goals	Apps	Goals	Apps	Goals	Apps	Goals
MVV	2021–22	Eerste Divisie	10	0	0	0	—		10	0
MVV	2022–23	Eerste Divisie	4	0	1	0	0	0	5	0
MVV	2023–24	Eerste Divisie	12	0	1	0	—		13	0
MVV	2024–25	Eerste Divisie	9	0	1	0	—		10	0
Career total			35	0	3	0	0	0	38	0
