= Geulle =

- Village
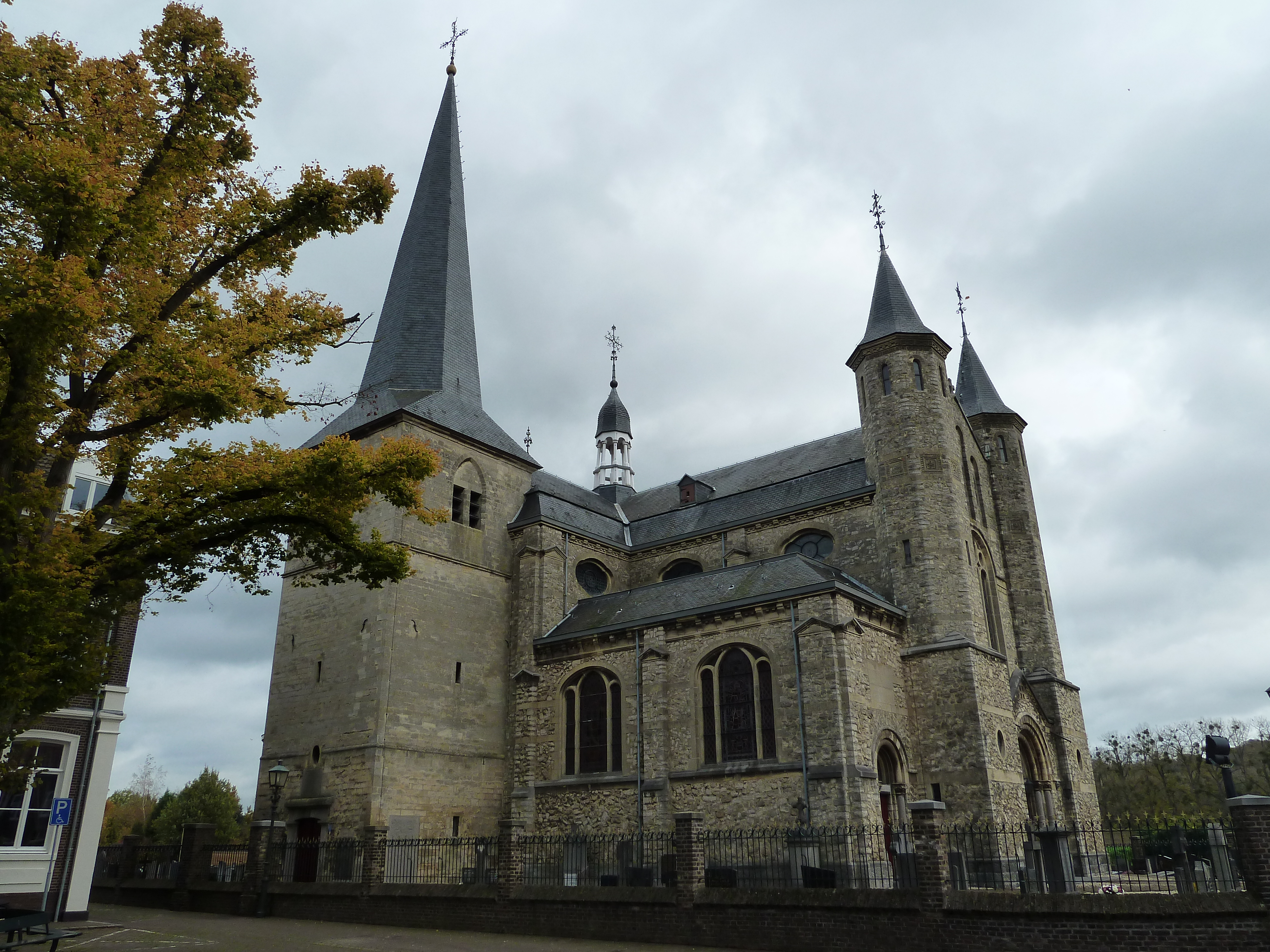
- St Martinus Church

- Coat of arms

- Location in the Netherlands Location in the province of Limburg in the Netherlands
- Coordinates: 50°55′21″N 5°45′1″E
- Country: Netherlands
- Province: Limburg
- Municipality: Meerssen

Area
  - Total: 2.20 km^{2} (0.85 sq mi)
- Elevation: 106 m (348 ft)

Population (2021)
  - Total: 180
  - Density: 82/km^{2} (210/sq mi)
- Time zone: UTC+1 (CET)
  - Summer (DST): UTC+2 (CEST)
- Postal code: 6243
- Dialing code: 043

Geulle (Dutch pronunciation: [ˈɣøːlə]; Limburgish: Gäöl [ˈɣœːl]) is a village in the Dutch province of Limburg. It is located in the municipality of Meerssen, about 8 km southwest of Geleen.

== History ==
The village was first mentioned in 1298 as Gole, and refers to the Geul River which used to flow past the village until the Maas moved two kilometres westwards in the early 15th century. Geulle developed in the Middle Ages at the former confluence of the Geul with the Maas. In 1375, it became part of the Land van Valkenburg. In 1839, it became part of the Kingdom of the Netherlands. Between 1931 and 1934, the Juliana Canal was dug and the village was split in two parts: Geulle and Geulle aan de Maas.

The St Martinus Church was first mentioned in 1298. The tower contains 14th century elements, and received its current height and shape in 1810. In 1920, the nave was demolished and a new church was built in its place.

The main building of Geulle Castle from 1620 still remains, however the remainder of the castle was demolished in 1847.

Geulle became the main settlement since the 1960s, because the village of Geulle aan de Maas was frequently flooded by the Maas. Geulle was a separate municipality until 1982, when it was merged with Meerssen.

== Gallery ==
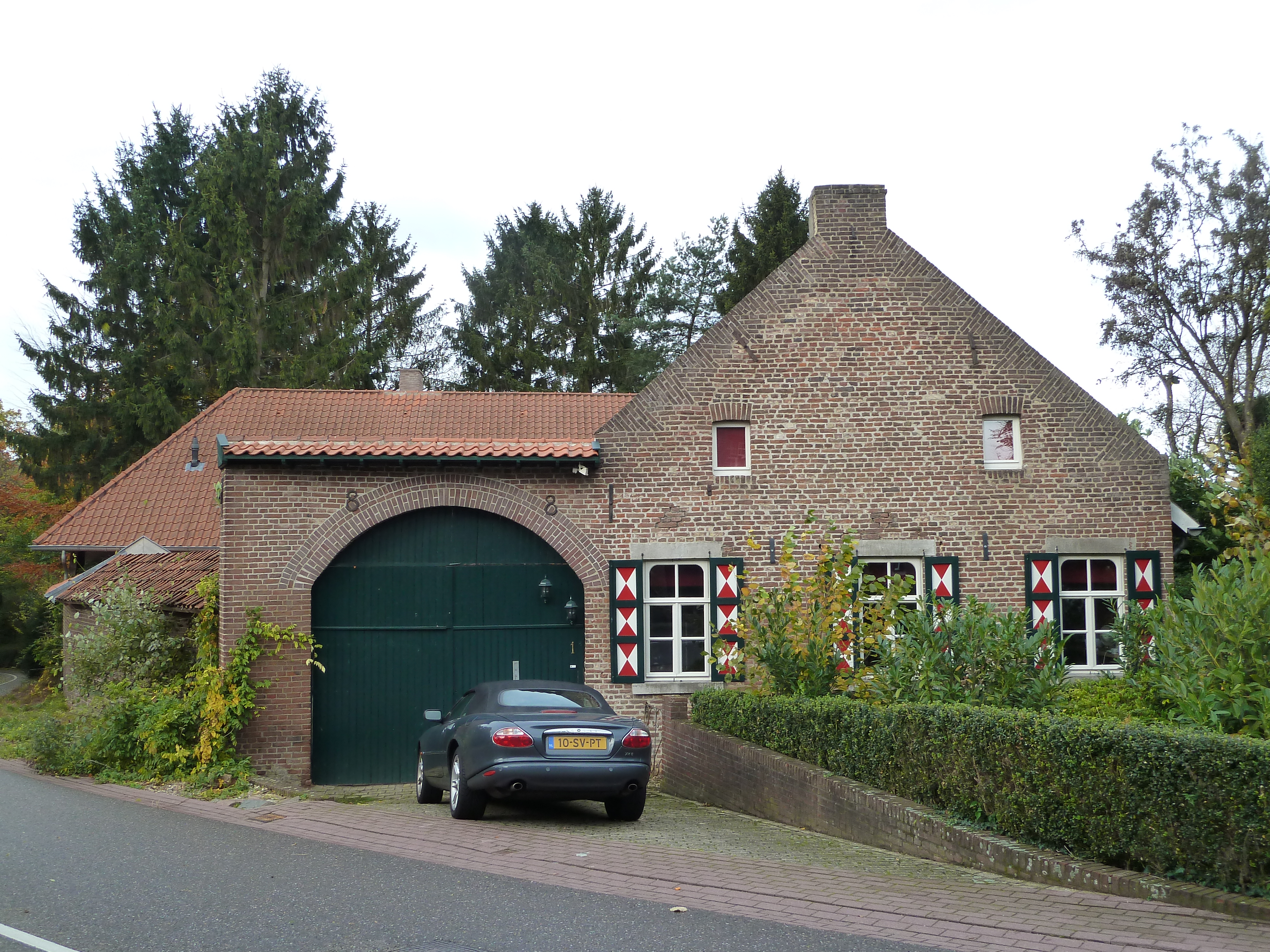
House in Geulle

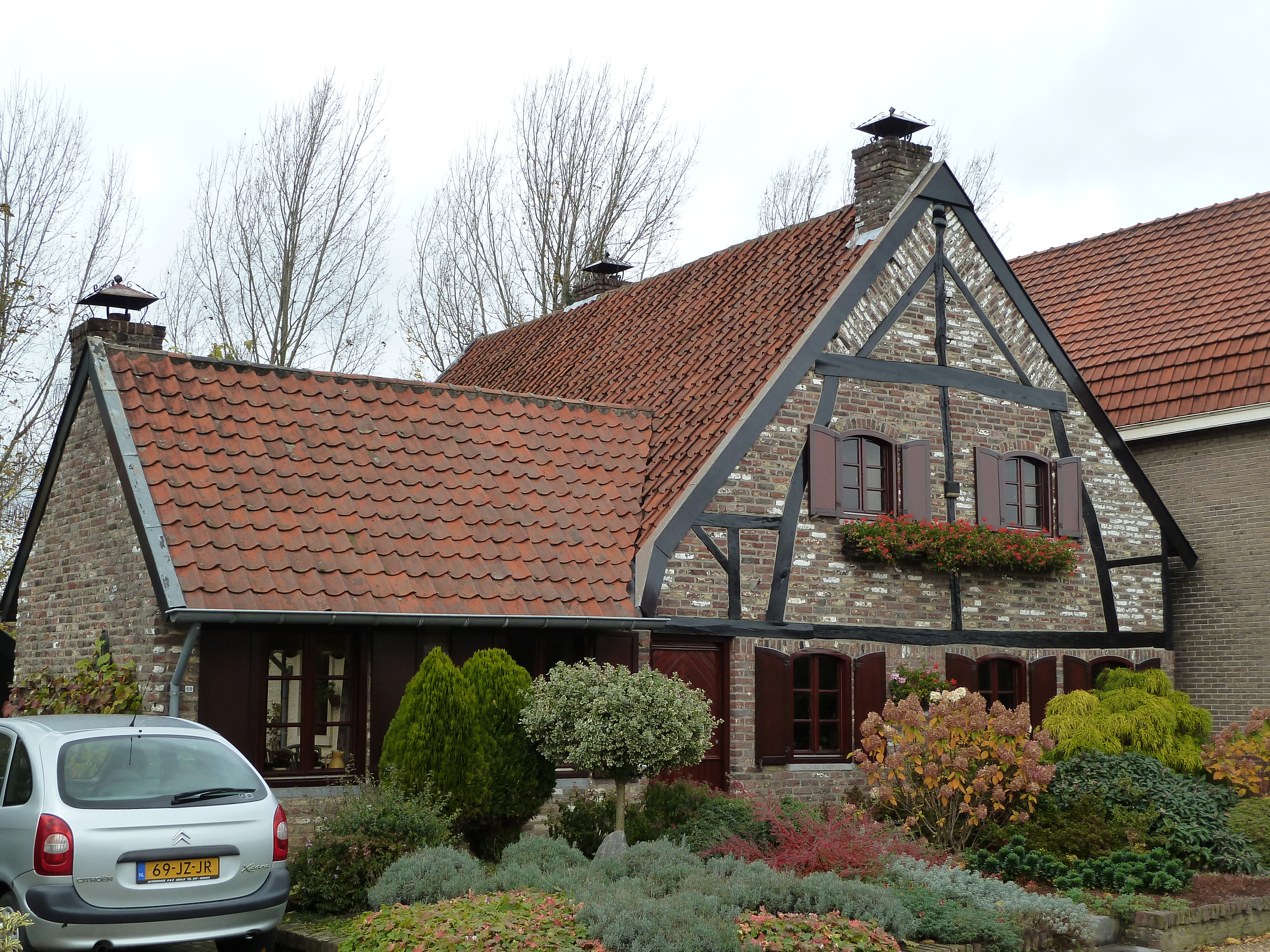
House in Geulle

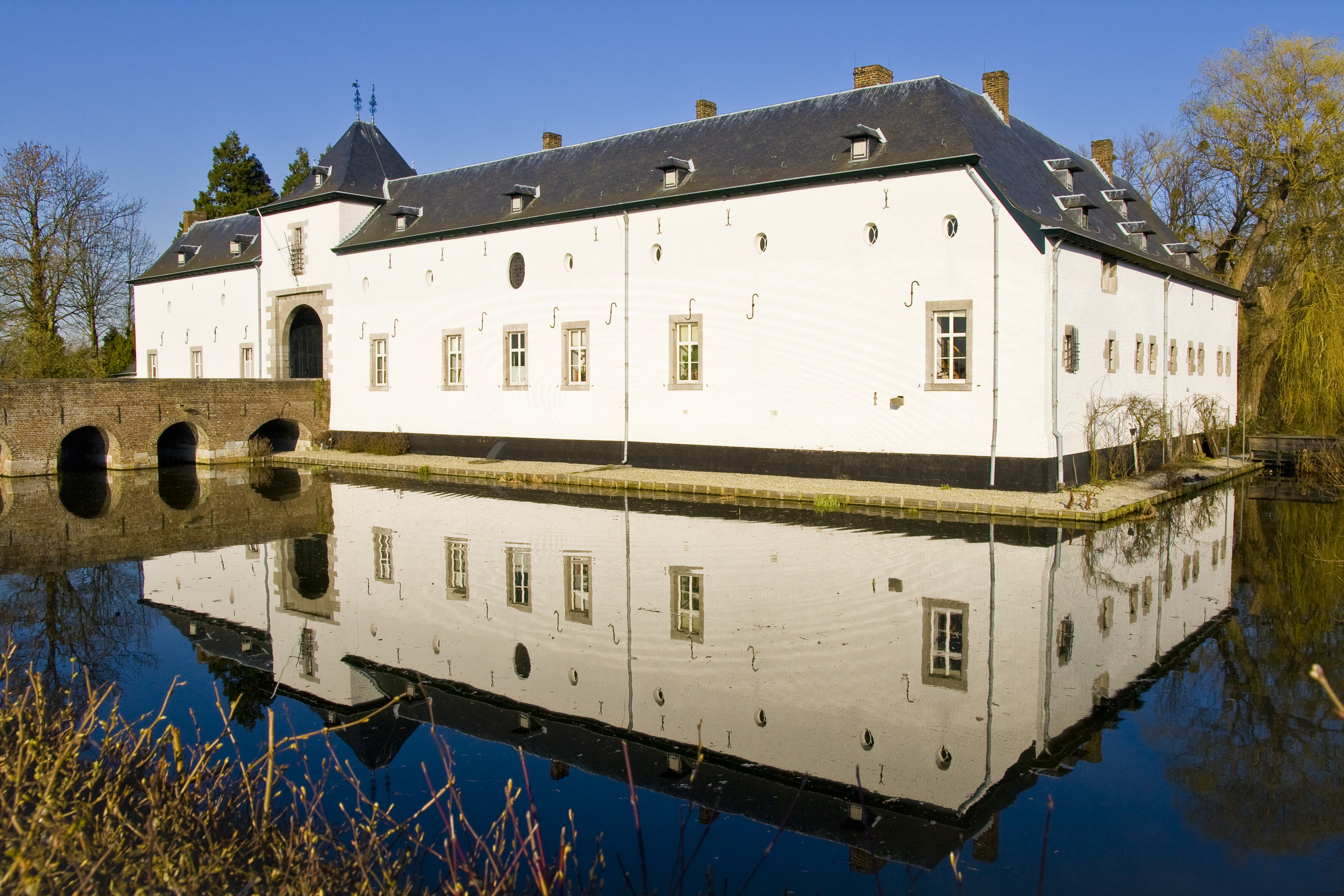
Geulle Castle

== Notable people ==
- Wil Jacobs, handball player (born 1960)
- Joan van der Mey, architect (1878–1949)
- Tim Zeegers, footballer (born 2000)
- Lars Schenk, footballer (born 2002)
