= Wil Jacobs =

Dutch handball player (born 1960)

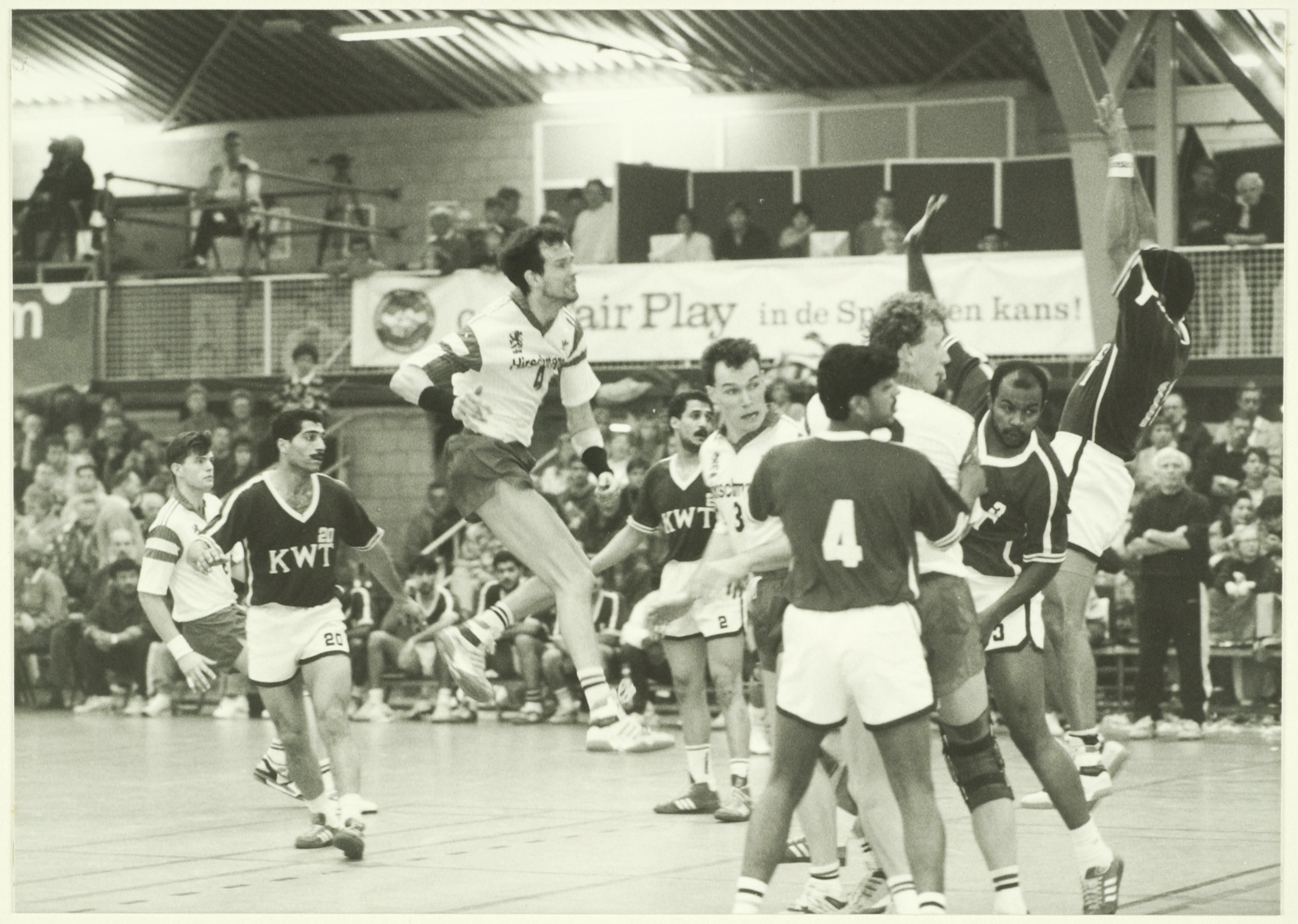
- Jacobs (right, partially covered by number 4) in Netherlands-Kuwait, 1991

Personal information
- Nationality: Dutch
- Born: 7 June 1960 (age 66) Geulle, Netherlands

Sport
- Sport: Handball

Senior clubs
- Years: Team
- –1985: Vlug en Lenig
- 1985–1988: Sporting Pelt
- 1988–1989: Vlug en Lenig
- 1989–1990: Sporting Pelt
- 1990–1997: Vlug en Lenig
National team
Years	Team	Apps	(Gls)
1980–1993	Netherlands	153	(395)

Teams managed
- 1997–1999: Vlug en Lenig
- 2013–2016: Vlug en Lenig (youth trainer)
- 2017: Bevo HC

Wil Jacobs (born 7 June 1960) is a Dutch retired handball player.

== Career ==
Jacobs started playing handball at the age of 14 at Vlug en Lenig. As a youth international, he participated in the Junior World Championships in 1979 (Denmark) and 1981 (Portugal). Jacobs made his debut in the national team on 28 March 1980 in Aarau against Switzerland (26-14 loss). The B-World Cup in France in 1981 was his first major tournament, finishing in tenth place. After that, four more World Cups followed for him. In 1988, during the first edition of the Limburgse Handbal Dagen, he became top scorer on behalf of Vlug en Lenig.

In 1985 Jacobs moved to Belgian side Neerpelt and stayed there for three years. In 1988 he returned to Vlug en Lenig for a season. In the 1989/1990 season Jacobs again played for Neerpelt, the following season he returned to Vlug and Lenig.

On 20 June 1993, a benefit match against Germany for the victims of an attack in Solingen became his last appearance in the national team. His active career ended in 1997, after which he spent more than a year training the team of which he himself had been a part as a player. Since then he has focused on his family.

In 2013, Jacobs went to train the B and later the A youth at Vlug and Lenig where his son played.

In 2017 he returned to the handball world for a short time, this time as interim coach of Bevo HC.
