= Lars Schenk =

Dutch footballer (born 2002)

Personal information
- Date of birth: 16 January 2002 (age 24)
- Place of birth: Geulle, Netherlands
- Height: 1.79 m (5 ft 10 in)
- Position: Left-back

Team information
- Current team: MVV
- Number: 34

Youth career
- Geulsche Boys
- MVV

Senior career*
Years	Team	Apps	(Gls)
2021–	MVV	79	(0)
- * Club domestic league appearances and goals as of 15 May 2025

Lars Schenk (born 16 January 2002) is a Dutch professional footballer who plays as a left-back for Eerste Divisie club MVV.

== Career ==
Schenk started playing football with Geulsche Boys alongside his nephew and future MVV teammate, Tim Zeegers. Both joined the MVV academy later on. On 12 December 2020, Schenk first appeared in MVV's matchday squad in their Eerste Divisie tie against FC Eindhoven, remaining as an unused substitute in the 4–0 loss.

He made his professional debut on 29 January 2022 in another league match against FC Eindhoven, replacing the injured Mitchel Keulen in the 21st minute of a 1–0 loss. Eleven first-team players were sidelined that day in the midst of the COVID-19 pandemic in the Netherlands. He made his first start the following matchday in a 5–0 loss to local rivals VVV-Venlo on 4 February, and continued as a starter the following games due to Keulen's injury.

On 26 June 2022, Schenk signed his first professional contract, a two-year deal, keeping him at MVV until 2024.

== Career statistics ==
As of match played 22 November 2024

Appearances and goals by club, season and competition
Club	Season	League			KNVB Cup		Other		Total	
Club	Season	Division	Apps	Goals	Apps	Goals	Apps	Goals	Apps	Goals
MVV	2021–22	Eerste Divisie	8	0	0	0	—		8	0
MVV	2022–23	Eerste Divisie	19	0	1	0	0	0	20	0
MVV	2023–24	Eerste Divisie	20	0	0	0	—		20	0
MVV	2024–25	Eerste Divisie	14	0	0	0	—		14	0
Career total			61	0	1	0	0	0	62	0
