= Tristan Weber =

American soccer player (born 2000)

Personal information
- Full name: Tristan Weber
- Date of birth: June 29, 2000 (age 26)
- Place of birth: San Luis Obispo, California, United States
- Height: 1.70 m (5 ft 7 in)
- Positions: Left winger; left back

Team information
- Current team: Carolina Core FC
- Number: 24

Youth career
- 2014–2016: LA Galaxy

College career
Years	Team	Apps	(Gls)
2018	Portland Pilots	14	(0)
2019–2020	San Diego State Aztecs	28	(3)

Senior career*
Years	Team	Apps	(Gls)
2017	Orange County FC	8	(2)
2018	Orange County SC U23	0	(0)
2018–2019	Orange County FC	4	(0)
2021	Las Vegas Lights	13	(0)
2022	Charleston Battery	12	(0)
2022	Columbus Crew 2	7	(0)
2023	Portland Timbers 2	15	(0)
2024	Capo FC	3	(0)
2026–	Carolina Core FC	0	(0)
- * Club domestic league appearances and goals as of September 22, 2022

Tristan Weber (born June 29, 2000) is an American soccer player.

== Career ==
=== Youth ===
Weber played high school soccer at San Clemente High School in California, where he was named the United Soccer Coaches National Player of the Year and the Gatorade California Boys Soccer Player of the Year. He also played club soccer with LA Galaxy academy between 2014 and 2016.

=== College and amateur ===
In 2018, Weber attended the University of Portland to play college soccer, going on to make 14 appearances for the Pilots in his freshman season, tallying three assists. In 2019, Weber transferred to San Diego State University, playing two seasons with the Aztecs, making 28 appearances, scoring three goals and tallying two assists.

Whilst at college, Weber spent time with Orange County FC in the NPSL in 2017, 2018 and 2019. He also spent time with Orange County SC U23 in the USL PDL in 2018, but didn't appear for the team.

=== Professional ===
On August 27, 2021, Weber signed with USL Championship side Las Vegas Lights. He made his debut the same day, appearing as a 66th-minute substitute during a 2–3 loss to LA Galaxy II.

On March 8, 2022, Weber signed with USL Championship club Charleston Battery ahead of their 2022 season.

On July 29, 2022, Weber signed with MLS Next Pro side Columbus Crew 2. Following the 2022 season, he was released by Columbus.

In 2024, Weber had a short stint with National Independent Soccer Association side Capo FC, where he made three appearances.

== Honors ==
Columbus Crew 2

- MLS Next Pro: 2022
