= Jimmy Vijgen =

Dutch footballer (born 2000)

Personal information
- Full name: Jimmy Roberto Vijgen
- Date of birth: 23 August 2000 (age 26)
- Place of birth: Heerlen, Netherlands
- Height: 1.73 m (5 ft 8 in)
- Position: Winger

Team information
- Current team: Groene Ster
- Number: 9

Youth career
- –2007: Groene Ster
- 2007–2019: Roda JC

Senior career*
Years	Team	Apps	(Gls)
2019–2022	Roda JC	6	(0)
2022–2023	MVV	2	(0)
2023–2024	Sporting Hasselt	20	(4)
2024–2025	UNA	11	(0)
2025–	Groene Ster		
- * Club domestic league appearances and goals as of 17:27, 4 August 2025 (UTC)

Jimmy Roberto Vijgen (born 23 August 2000) is a Dutch footballer who plays as a winger for Groene Ster.

== Career ==
Vijgen was born in Heerlen, Limburg, and started playing youth football for Groene Ster. After one year, as a seven-year-old, he joined the Roda JC academy. In 2019, he was promoted to Roda's under-21 team. He made his professional debut for the first team on 28 March 2021, replacing Dylan Vente in the 89th minute of a 3–1 home win over Cambuur.

On 29 July 2022, Vijgen signed a one-year contract with Eerste Divisie rivals MVV. He made his debut for the club on 9 September, replacing Sven Blummel in the 86th minute of a 5–0 away defeat to FC Eindhoven.

In the summer of 2023, Vijgen joined Belgian Division 2 club Sporting Hasselt.

In February 2024, Derde Divisie club UNA announced their signing of Vijgen ahead of the 2024–25 season.

== Personal life ==
In 2021, Vijgen graduated from Arcus College in Heerlen as a sales specialist, an education he chose due to his parents being in the catering industry.

== Career statistics ==
As of match played 3 May 2025

Appearances and goals by club, season and competition
Club	Season	League			National cup		Other		Total	
Club	Season	Division	Apps	Goals	Apps	Goals	Apps	Goals	Apps	Goals
Roda JC	2020–21	Eerste Divisie	3	0	0	0	0	0	3	0
Roda JC	2021–22	Eerste Divisie	3	0	2	0	0	0	5	0
Roda JC	Total		6	0	2	0	0	0	8	0
MVV	2022–23	Eerste Divisie	2	0	0	0	0	0	2	0
Sporting Hasselt	2023–24	Belgian Division 2	20	4	1	0	—		21	4
UNA	2024–25	Derde Divisie	11	0	1	0	—		12	0
Career total			39	4	4	0	0	0	43	4
