= Nelson Martinez (soccer) =

American soccer player (born 2001)

Personal information
- Date of birth: March 3, 2001 (age 25)
- Place of birth: Woodbridge, Virginia, U.S.
- Height: 5 ft 9 in (1.75 m)
- Position: Defender

Team information
- Current team: Carolina Core
- Number: 21

Youth career
- 2015–2019: D.C. United

Senior career*
Years	Team	Apps	(Gls)
2019–2020	Loudoun United	25	(1)
2021–2022	North Carolina FC	52	(1)
2023–2024	Loudoun United	4	(0)
2024–2025	FAS	9	(0)
2025	Platense	13	(0)
2026–	Carolina Core FC	0	(0)

International career
2018	United States U18	1	(0)
- * Club domestic league appearances and goals as of October 16, 2023

Nelson Martinez (born March 3, 2001) is an American professional soccer player who plays as a defender who currently plays for Carolina Core FC in MLS Next Pro.

== Career ==
=== Loudoun United ===
Martinez made his professional debut on June 5, 2019, in a 3–2 win against Swope Park Rangers. He signed his first professional contract with Loudoun United on June 26, 2020, for the remainder of the 2020 season.

=== North Carolina FC ===
In March 2021, Martinez joined North Carolina FC of USL League One.

== Personal life ==
Martinez is a dual national of the United States and El Salvador.
