= Arnaud Tattevin =

Central African footballer (born 2000)

Personal information
- Full name: Arnaud Abbas Tattevin Tinor
- Date of birth: 26 February 2000 (age 26)
- Place of birth: Paris, France
- Height: 1.71 m (5 ft 7 in)
- Position: Forward

Team information
- Current team: Carolina Core FC
- Number: 26

Youth career
- 2008–2010: AS Saint-Jacques
- 2010–2019: Rennes

College career
Years	Team	Apps	(Gls)
2023–2025	UNCG Spartans	32	(14)

Senior career*
Years	Team	Apps	(Gls)
2017–2020	Rennes II	23	(2)
2020	Côte Bleue	1	(1)
2020–2022	Paris FC	4	(1)
2020–2022	Paris FC II	7	(2)
2022	Avranches	10	(2)
2022	Avranches II	2	(2)
2022–2023	Borgo	13	(3)
2025	Vermont Green FC	11	(6)
2026–	Carolina Core FC	22	(12)

International career
2015	France U16	2	(0)
2016	France U17	1	(1)
2021	Central African Republic	2	(0)
- * Club domestic league appearances and goals as of 6 September 2026

Arnaud Abbas Tattevin Tinor (born 26 February 2000) is a footballer who plays as a forward for MLS Next Pro club Carolina Core FC. Born in France, he plays for the Central African Republic national team.

== Club career ==
In October 2020, Tattevin joined Paris FC. On 1 February 2022, he moved to Avranches. He joined Borgo in August 2022. In February 2025, he joined USL League Two club Vermont Green FC ahead of the 2025 season. In April 2026, he joined MLS Next Pro club Carolina Core FC.

== International career ==
Born in France, Tattevin represented France at youth level before switching allegiance to Central African Republic. As a youth international of France, he was part of their 2017 UEFA European Under-17 Championship qualification campaign and scored a goal in 7–0 win against Estonia.

In October 2019, Tattevin was named in Central African Republic squad for a friendly against Niger. He debuted with the Central African Republic in a friendly 5–0 loss to Rwanda on 8 June 2021.

== Career statistics ==
=== International ===
As of 1 September 2021

Appearances and goals by national team and year
National team	Year	Apps	Goals
Central African Republic	2021	2	0
Total		2	0
