= David Díaz =

David Díaz may refer to:

- David Díaz (boxer) (born 1976), American boxer
- David Díaz (basketball) (born 1964), Venezuelan basketball player
- David Díaz (footballer) (born 1991), Salvadoran football attacker
- David Díaz (illustrator) (born 1960), American illustrator

== See also ==
- David Díaz Mangano (born 1992), commonly known as Bicho, Spanish football midfielder
- David Diaz-Infante (born 1964), American football player
