= Lorenzo Noviello =

Belgian footballer (born 2002)

Personal information
- Date of birth: 2 March 2002 (age 24)
- Place of birth: Genk, Belgium
- Height: 1.75 m (5 ft 9 in)
- Position: Midfielder

Team information
- Current team: Bocholt
- Number: 11

Youth career
- Genk
- Westerlo

Senior career*
Years	Team	Apps	(Gls)
2021–2022	Westerlo	5	(0)
2022–2023	MVV	1	(0)
2023–	Bocholt	74	(23)
- * Club domestic league appearances and goals as of 21:04, 10 November 2026 (UTC)

Lorenzo Noviello (born 2 March 2002) is a Belgian professional footballer who plays as a midfielder for Belgian Division 2 club Bocholt.

== Career ==
=== Westerlo ===
In 2021, Noviello signed a season-long contract with Westerlo with an option for a further season. It was the first professional contract of his career. He made his professional debut on 15 August 2021, replacing Ján Bernát in the 82nd minute of a 2–0 away win over Virton in the Challenger Pro League.

=== MVV ===
Noviello joined Eerste Divisie club MVV Maastricht on 20 June 2022, signing a one-year contract. Mainly a reserve during his first season, he made his debut for the club on 12 May 2023, coming off the bench in the 95th minute of a 2–1 league victory against Telstar.

=== Bocholt ===
On 2 May 2023, it was announced that Noviello had signed with Belgian Division 2 club Bocholt ahead of the new season.

== Career statistics ==
As of match played 12 May 2023

Appearances and goals by club, season and competition
Club	Season	League			National cup		Other		Total	
Club	Season	Division	Apps	Goals	Apps	Goals	Apps	Goals	Apps	Goals
Westerlo	2021–22	Challenger Pro League	5	0	2	0	—		7	0
MVV	2022–23	Eerste Divisie	1	0	0	0	0	0	1	0
Career total			6	0	2	0	0	0	8	0

== Honours ==
Westerlo

- Belgian First Division B: 2021–22
