= Nicholas Kaloukian =

American-Armenian footballer (born 2003)

Personal information
- Full name: Nicholas John Kaloukian
- Date of birth: 18 February 2003 (age 23)
- Place of birth: Wayne, New Jersey, U.S.
- Height: 1.85 m (6 ft 1 in)
- Position: Forward

Team information
- Current team: Carolina Core FC
- Number: 9

College career
Years	Team	Apps	(Gls)
2022	Michigan Wolverines		
2023–2025	Syracuse Orange		

Senior career*
Years	Team	Apps	(Gls)
2025–2026	Urartu	33	(5)
2026–	Carolina Core FC	0	(0)

International career^{‡}
2023–2024	Armenia U21	3	(1)
2025–	Armenia	1	(0)
- * Club domestic league appearances and goals as of 9 June 2026 ‡ National team caps and goals as of 20 March 2025

Nicholas John Kaloukian (Armenian: Նիկոլաս Ջոն Կալուկյան; born 18 February 2003) is a professional football player who plays as a forward for MLS Next Pro club Carolina Core FC. Born in the United States, he plays for the Armenia national football team.

== Club career ==
Kaloukian started playing football in TSF Academy then later joined Cedar Stars Academy. Raised in Wayne, New Jersey, Kaloukian attended Wayne Hills High School, but chose to play club soccer rather than play for his high school team.

On 20 February 2025, Kaloukian signed a contract with Urartu. On 4 June 2026, Urartu announced that Kaloukian had left the club at the end of his contract.

== International career ==
On 13 March 2025, he received his first call-up to the Armenia national team for a 2024–25 UEFA Nations League playoff matches against Georgia on 20 March 2025 and 23 March 2025 respectively.

Kaloukian made his senior international debut for Armenia on 20 March 2025 in the 2024–25 UEFA Nations League playoff matches against Georgia.

== Personal life ==
His father, John Kalukian, is the founder of sports management agency Next Level Sports Concierge. Nicholas have two sisters.

== Career statistics ==
=== International ===
As of match played 20 March 2025

National team	Year	Apps	Goals
Armenia	2025	1	0
Total		1	0
