= Nick Holliday =

American soccer player (born 2006)

Personal information
- Full name: Nicholas Holliday
- Date of birth: January 17, 2006 (age 20)
- Place of birth: Chapel Hill, North Carolina, United States
- Height: 6 ft 1 in (1.85 m)
- Position: Goalkeeper

Team information
- Current team: Carolina Core FC
- Number: 1

Youth career
- Triangle United
- North Carolina FC

Senior career*
Years	Team	Apps	(Gls)
2021	North Carolina FC U23	5	(0)
2021–2023	North Carolina FC	26	(1)
2024–2025	Crown Legacy FC	9	(0)
- * Club domestic league appearances and goals as of March 12, 2026

Nicholas Holliday (born January 17, 2006) is an American professional soccer player who plays as a goalkeeper for MLS Next Pro club Carolina Core FC.

== Club career ==
Born in Chapel Hill, North Carolina, Holliday began playing recreational soccer at the age of four. Growing up, he also played basketball, lacrosse, and baseball. After rising through Triangle United, Holliday joined the youth academy at then USL Championship club North Carolina FC. In 2020, Holliday signed an academy contract with North Carolina FC, allowing him to play matches while keeping NCAA eligibility.

On May 19, 2021, Holliday made his debut for North Carolina FC U23, the club's USL League Two affiliate, against West Virginia United, starting and playing 45 minutes in the 0–2 defeat.

Holliday made his professional debut for North Carolina FC in USL League One on June 20, 2021, against Chattanooga Red Wolves. He made 10 saves for North Carolina FC despite the club losing 2–3. During his debut, he became the youngest USL League One player to appear for an independent club in league history. On May 21, 2022, Holliday earned his first professional shutout during a 1–0 victory over Greenville Triumph SC.

== International career ==
Holliday was called in to the United States U-17 national team training camp in November 2021 and again in January 2022.

== Career statistics ==
=== Club ===
As of 8 June 2022

Appearances and goals by club, season and competition
Club	Season	League			National Cup		Continental		Total	
Club	Season	Division	Apps	Goals	Apps	Goals	Apps	Goals	Apps	Goals
North Carolina FC U23	2021	USL League Two	5	0	—		—		5	0
North Carolina FC	2021	USL League One	2	0	—		—		2	0
Career total			7	0	0	0	0	0	7	0
