= Marko Kleinen =

Dutch footballer (born 2001)

Personal information
- Full name: Marko Servatius Ghislaine Kleinen
- Date of birth: 27 July 2001 (age 25)
- Place of birth: Maastricht, Netherlands
- Height: 1.83 m (6 ft 0 in)
- Position: Midfielder

Youth career
- 2011–2020: MVV Maastricht

Senior career*
| Years | Team | Apps | (Gls) |
| 2020–2026 | MVV Maastricht | 171 | (5) |
- * Club domestic league appearances and goals as of 28 April 2026

Marko Servatius Ghislaine Kleinen (born 27 July 2001) is a Dutch professional footballer who plays as a midfielder.

== Career ==
Kleinen joined the MVV Maastricht youth academy from his first club RKSV Leonidas-W in 2011. In the 2019–20 season, he featured as an unused substitute for the first team on several occasions. He made his professional debut on 30 August 2020, replacing Tim Zeegers in the 79th minute of a 0–0 away draw in the Eerste Divisie against Almere City.

On 13 February 2021, Kleinen made his first ever start for MVV in a 1–0 away defeat to De Graafschap. Four days later, he signed his first professional deal with MVV; a two-year contract.

Kleinen scored his first goal at senior level on 30 September 2022, starting MVV's eventual 3–2 second-half comeback win over Willem II by curling home a shot into the right-hand corner. On 21 April 2023, he extended his contract with MVV until 2025 with an option for an additional year. The option was exercised in April 2025, extending his contract until 2026. Later that month, Dutch media reported that Kleinen had declined a four-year extension proposed by MVV.

== Career statistics ==
As of match played 26 September 2025

Appearances and goals by club, season and competition
| Club | Season | League | | | KNVB Cup | | Other | | Total | |
| Club | Season | Division | Apps | Goals | Apps | Goals | Apps | Goals | Apps | Goals |
|---|---|---|---|---|---|---|---|---|---|---|
| MVV | 2020–21 | Eerste Divisie | 19 | 0 | 0 | 0 | — | | 19 | 0 |
| MVV | 2021–22 | Eerste Divisie | 31 | 0 | 0 | 0 | — | | 31 | 0 |
| MVV | 2022–23 | Eerste Divisie | 26 | 2 | 1 | 0 | 0 | 0 | 27 | 2 |
| MVV | 2023–24 | Eerste Divisie | 34 | 1 | 1 | 0 | — | | 35 | 1 |
| MVV | 2024–25 | Eerste Divisie | 36 | 1 | 2 | 0 | — | | 38 | 1 |
| MVV | 2025–26 | Eerste Divisie | 7 | 0 | 0 | 0 | — | | 7 | 0 |
| Career total | | | 153 | 4 | 4 | 0 | 0 | 0 | 157 | 4 |
