= Robinson Aguirre =

Salvadoran footballer (born 2004)

Personal information
- Full name: Robinson Aguirre Ortega
- Date of birth: 23 November 2004 (age 21)
- Place of birth: Fairfax, Virginia, U.S.
- Height: 1.75 m (5 ft 9 in)
- Position: Midfielder

Team information
- Current team: Carolina Core FC
- Number: 23

Youth career
- 2019–2022: Colorado Rapids

Senior career*
Years	Team	Apps	(Gls)
2022–2025	Colorado Rapids 2	15	(1)
2026–	Carolina Core FC	0	(0)

International career^{‡}
2022–	El Salvador U20	11	(0)
2022–	El Salvador	2	(0)
- * Club domestic league appearances and goals as of 01:42, 3 October 2022 (UTC) ‡ National team caps and goals as of 01:42, 3 October 2022 (UTC)

Robinson Aguirre Ortega (born 23 November 2004) is a professional footballer who plays as a midfielder for Carolina Core FC. Born in the United States, he plays for the El Salvador national team.

== Professional career ==
A product of the youth academy of Colorado Rapids, Aguirre was promoted to Colorado Rapids 2 squad in the MLS Next Pro for the 2022 season.

== International career ==
Aguirre was born in the United States to a Honduran father and Salvadoran mother. He was first called up to play for the El Salvador U20s for the Dallas Cup in April 2022, and the 2022 CONCACAF U-20 Championship in June. He was first called up to the senior El Salvador national team for a set of friendlies in April 2022. He debuted as a late substitute in a 4–0 friendly loss to Guatemala on 24 April 2022.
