= Truist Point =

Baseball stadium in High Point, North Carolina, US

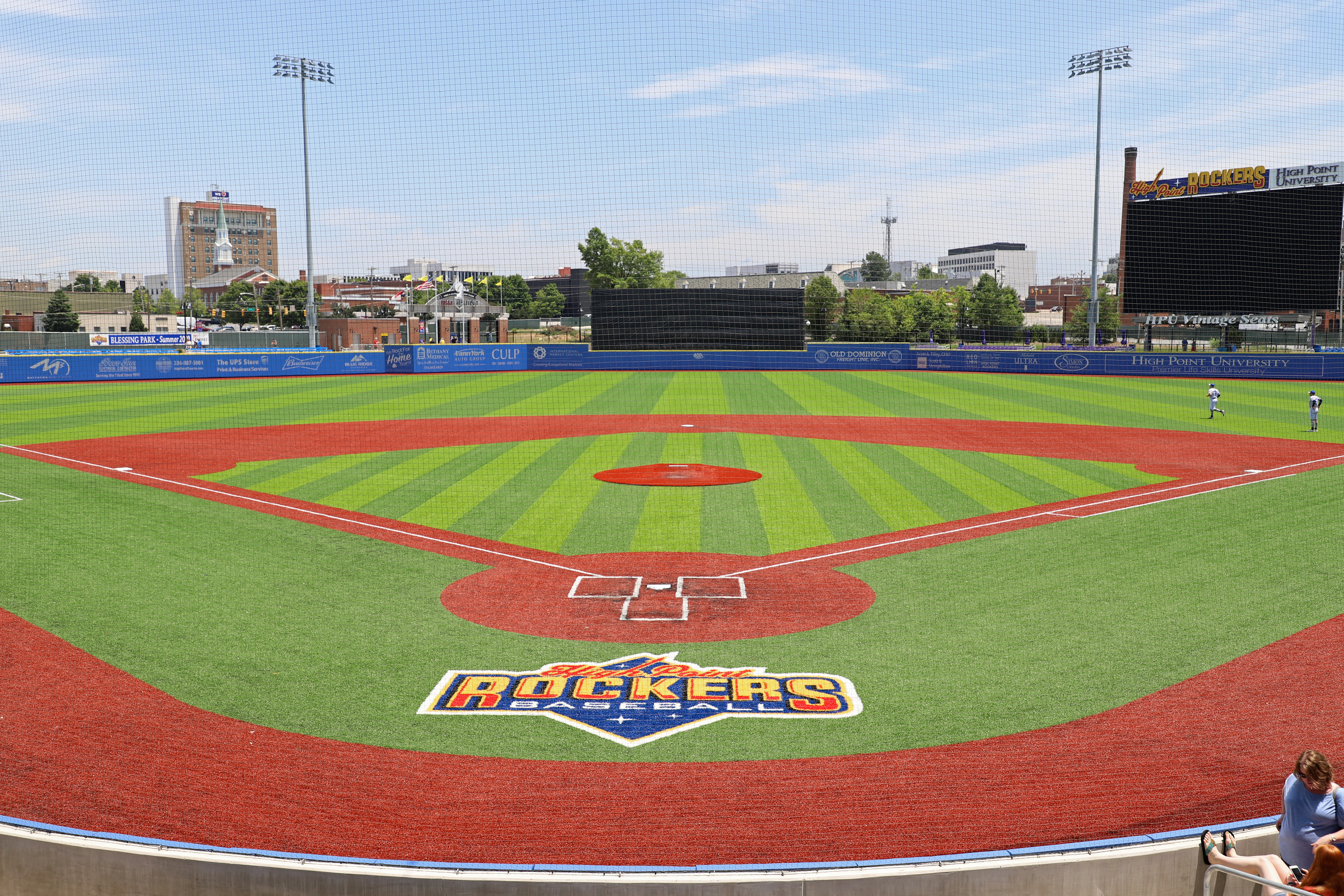
- Truist Point in 2019

- Location within North Carolina Truist Point (the United States)
- Interactive map of Truist Point
- Former names: BB&T Point (2019–2020)
- Address: 301 N. Elm Street; High Point, North Carolina
- Coordinates: 35°57′34″N 80°00′43″W
- Capacity: 4,500
- Surface: Astroturf
- Field size: Left: 336 ft (102 m); Left center: 363 ft (111 m); Center: 400 ft (120 m); Right center: 366 ft (112 m); Right: 339 ft (103 m)

Construction
- Groundbreaking: April 11, 2018
- Opened: May 2, 2019
- Cost: $36 million
- Builder: Samet Corp.

Tenants
- High Point Rockers (ALPB) 2019–present Carolina Core FC (MLSNP) 2024–present

Website
- Truist Point

Truist Point is a stadium located in High Point, North Carolina, and is home to the High Point Rockers of the Atlantic League of Professional Baseball and to Carolina Core FC of the MLS NEXT Pro league. The stadium is bordered by Elm, English, Gatewood and Lindsay streets. Truist (formerly BB&T Corporation) is paying $500,000 annually for 15 years for the naming rights.

The stadium hosted its first official event on May 2, 2019, as the High Point Rockers defeated the Sugar Land Skeeters in their first ever Opening Day game.

The ballpark was renamed from BB&T Point to Truist Point in June 2020 due to the 2019 merger of BB&T and SunTrust Banks to form Truist.

In 2021, North Carolina Fusion U23's men's and women's teams began playing some matches at Truist Point.

In 2024, Carolina Core FC of the MLS NEXT Pro league began play at Truist Point.

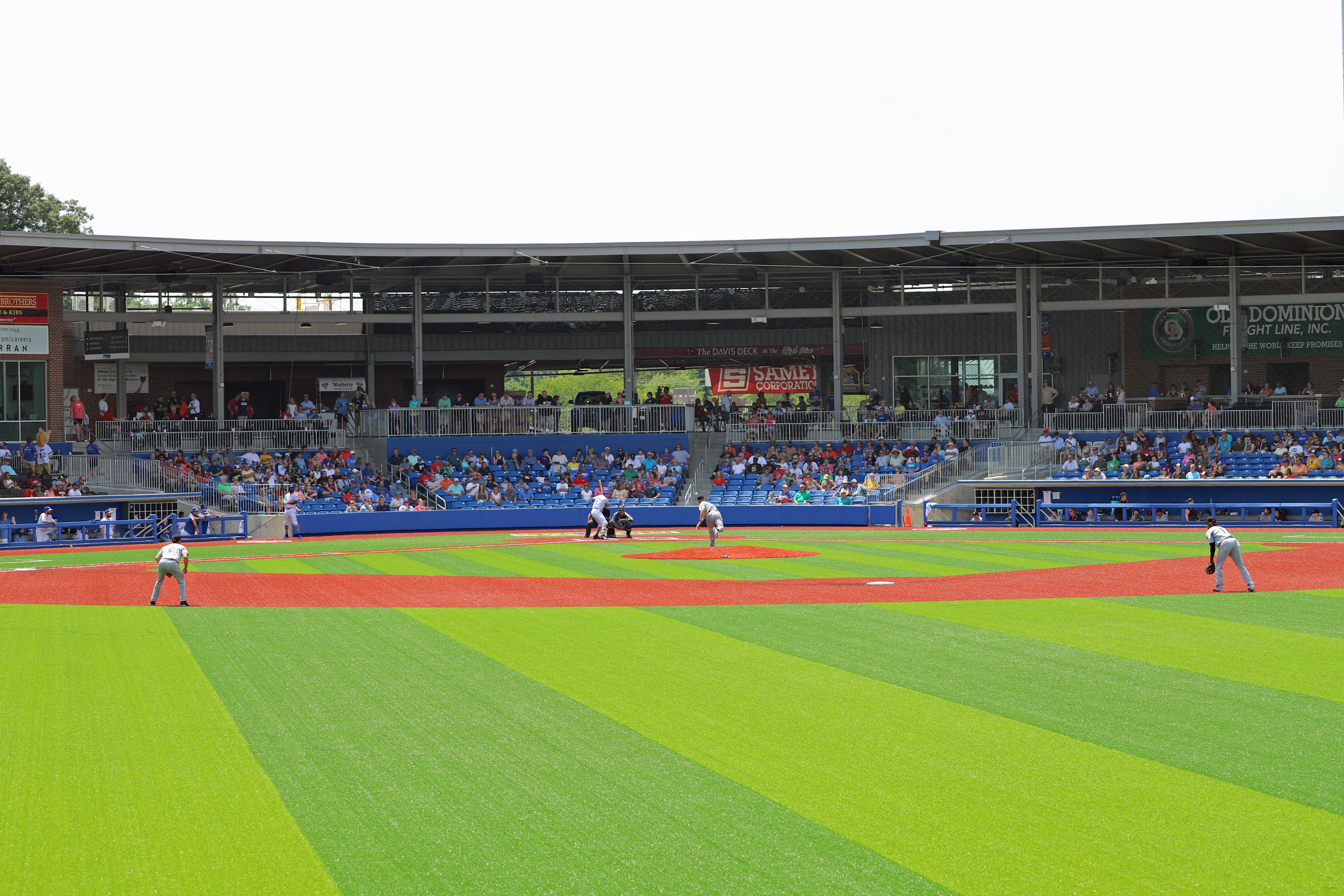
Truist Point, High Point, North Carolina, June 16, 2019
