= Tunahan Taşçı =

Turkish footballer (born 2002)

Personal information
- Full name: Muhammet Tunahan Taşçı
- Date of birth: 29 April 2002 (age 24)
- Place of birth: Nijmegen, Netherlands
- Height: 1.72 m (5 ft 8 in)
- Position: Winger

Team information
- Current team: Ümraniyespor (on loan from Konyaspor)
- Number: 77

Youth career
- 2006–2012: VV Union
- 2012–2014: Vitesse
- 2014–2019: NEC
- 2019–2020: Ajax
- 2021–2022: Fortuna Sittard

Senior career*
Years	Team	Apps	(Gls)
2020–2021	Jong Ajax	5	(0)
2022–2024	Fortuna Sittard	10	(0)
2023–2024	→ MVV (loan)	22	(6)
2024–	Konyaspor	26	(2)
2026–	→ Ümraniyespor (loan)	8	(0)

International career
2018–2019	Turkey U17	9	(0)
2019–2020	Turkey U18	7	(0)
- * Club domestic league appearances and goals as of 18 October 2026

Muhammet Tunahan Taşçı (born 29 April 2002) is a professional footballer who plays as a winger for TFF 1. Lig club Ümraniyespor on loan from Konyaspor. Born in the Netherlands, Taşçı represents Turkey internationally.

== Club career ==
=== Early career ===
Taşçı began his footballing career in his local club VV Union at the age of four, before moving to Vitesse and NEC to continue his training. He joined the Ajax academy in 2019, signing a two-year contract.

Taşçı made his professional debut with Jong Ajax as a late substitute for Ar'jany Martha in a 4–0 Eerste Divisie loss to Roda JC on 30 August 2020.

=== Fortuna Sittard ===
On 7 September 2021, Taşçı joined Fortuna Sittard and was assigned to the club's under-21 squad. He made his debut for the first team on 2 October 2022, replacing Iñigo Córdoba in the 71st minute of a 2–0 Eredivisie victory against Volendam. On 19 October, he made his first ever start, playing 56 minutes of a 3–2 loss in the KNVB Cup to his former club NEC, before coming off for Burak Yılmaz. On 23 March 2023, Taşçı extended his contract with Fortuna until 2026.

==== Loan to MVV ====
On 17 August 2023, Taşçı joined Eerste Divisie club MVV on a season-long loan. He made his debut as a starter for De Sterrendragers on 25 August, in a 2–2 away draw against Dordrecht. On 8 September, Taşçı scored his first professional goal, opening the score in a 2–1 away loss against Willem II.

=== Konyaspor ===
On 9 July 2024, Taşçı joined Konyaspor on a three-year deal.

== International career ==
Born in the Netherlands, Taşçı is of Turkish descent. He is a youth international for Turkey.

== Style of play ==
A winger, Taşçı described his style of play as unique and "different from others", attributing his technical ability to playing street football on the Johan Cruyff Court in Nijmegen, Netherlands, where he frequently engaged in matches with players of various ages, which helped him improve and gain confidence. He has been a fan of Ajax since his youth due to their attacking tactics, and modelled his play after the likes of Hakim Ziyech, David Neres and Quincy Promes.

== Career statistics ==
As of match played 10 May 2024

Appearances and goals by club, season and competition
Club	Season	League			KNVB Cup		Other		Total	
Club	Season	Division	Apps	Goals	Apps	Goals	Apps	Goals	Apps	Goals
Jong Ajax	2020–21	Eerste Divisie	5	0	—		—		5	0
Fortuna Sittard	2022–23	Eredivisie	10	0	1	0	—		11	0
MVV (loan)	2023–24	Eerste Divisie	22	6	1	0	—		23	6
Career total			37	6	2	0	0	0	39	6
