= Carolina Core FC =

- Full name: Carolina Core Football Club
- Founded: November 10, 2022; 3 years ago
- Stadium: Truist Point; High Point, North Carolina
- Capacity: 5,000
- Owners: Megan Oglesby; Matt Penley; Mark Penley
- Head coach: Jake Davis
- League: MLS Next Pro
- Website: https://www.carolinacorefc.com
| Home colors | Away colors |

Carolina Core FC is an American professional soccer team based in High Point, North Carolina. They were founded in 2022, competing in MLS Next Pro since the 2024 season as an independent team. The team plays at Truist Point Stadium.

== History ==
On November 10, 2022, MLS Next Pro announced that a new independent club from North Carolina would join the league in 2024. The club was to be led by Eddie Pope as its Chief Sporting Director and owned by Megan Oglesby, Matt Penley, and Mark Penley. Their announced home venue, Truist Point, would undergo renovations to increase the seating capacity to 5,000.

Carolina ended their inaugural season with 12 wins, 12 losses, and four draws with three penalty shootout victories. Head coach Roy Lassiter was relieved of his duties following the season. He would be replaced by Donovan Ricketts during the offseason.

== Players and staff ==
=== Current roster ===
As of August 21, 2026

| No. | Pos. | Nation | Player |
|---|---|---|---|
| 1 | GK | USA | Nick Holliday (on loan from Crown Legacy FC) |
| 2 | DF | USA | Charles Orbaugh |
| 4 | DF | USA | Nolan Evers |
| 6 | MF | USA | Ricardo Montenengro |
| 8 | MF | USA | Corey Lundeen |
| 9 | FW | ARM | Nicholas Kaloukian |
| 14 | FW | USA | Khalid Balogun |
| 15 | FW | USA | Tony Pineda |
| 16 | MF | USA | Mohamed Diakite |
| 18 | DF | USA | Dominique Colon |
| 19 | MF | USA | Seth Hammond |
| 20 | MF | NZL | Thomas Raimbault |
| 21 | MF | USA | Nelson Martinez |
| 23 | MF | USA | Robinson Aguirre |
| 24 | DF | USA | Tristan Weber |
| 25 | DF | USA | Bryce Swineheart |
| 26 | FW | CAF | Arnaud Tattevin |
| 27 | MF | USA | Andrew Czech |
| 33 | DF | USA | Bodie Ford |
| 44 | GK | USA | Trevor Jackson |
| 55 | MF | USA | Graham Ford |
| 58 | MF | USA | David Diaz |
| 77 | DF | GHA | Rashid Tetteh |
| 88 | MF | USA | Ryan Baer |
| 90 | GK | USA | Nolan Anderson |
| 99 | DF | USA | Grayson Rockhill |

=== Staff ===
- Jake Davis - Head Coach
- David A. Hughes - Interim Assistant Coach
- Robert Ritchie - Director Of Soccer Operations

=== Year-by-year ===
| Season | MLS Next Pro | | | | | | | | | Playoffs | U.S. Open Cup | Top Scorer | |
| Season | P | W | D | L | GF | GA | Pts | Conference | Overall | Playoffs | U.S. Open Cup | Player | Goals |
|---|---|---|---|---|---|---|---|---|---|---|---|---|---|
| 2024 | 28 | 12 | 4 | 12 | 39 | 45 | 43 | 10th, Eastern | 15th | Did not qualify | Third Round | (Argentina) Facundo Canete | 11 |
| 2025 | 28 | 8 | 10 | 10 | 42 | 44 | 39 | 8th, Eastern | 17th | Conference Quarterfinals | Second Round | (Argentina) Facundo Canete | 9 |
| 2026 | 22 | 4 | 8 | 10 | 30 | 40 | 23 | 14th, Eastern | 25th | Did not qualify | First Round | (Central African Republic) Arnaud Tattevin | 12 |

=== Head coaches record ===
As of September 20, 2026

| Name | Nationality | From | To | P | W | D | L | GF | GA | Win% |
|---|---|---|---|---|---|---|---|---|---|---|
| Roy Lassiter | United States | June 15, 2023 | October 15, 2024 | 31 | 14 | 4 | 13 | 44 | 49 | 45.16 |
| Donovan Ricketts | Jamaica | October 18, 2024 | May 26, 2026 | 43 | 10 | 14 | 19 | 61 | 75 | 23.26 |
| Jake Davis | United States | May 26, 2026 | Present | 17 | 4 | 7 | 6 | 28 | 31 | 23.53 |
