= Tim Zeegers =

Dutch footballer (born 2000)

Personal information
- Date of birth: 12 March 2000 (age 26)
- Place of birth: Geulle, Netherlands
- Height: 1.78 m (5 ft 10 in)
- Positions: Midfielder; right-back

Team information
- Current team: Carolina Core FC
- Number: 7

Youth career
- Geulsche Boys
- –2020: MVV

Senior career*
Years	Team	Apps	(Gls)
2020–2025	MVV	122	(0)
2026–	Carolina Core FC	0	(0)
- * Club domestic league appearances and goals as of 15 May 2025

Tim Zeegers (born 12 March 2000) is a Dutch professional footballer who plays as a midfielder or right-back for MLS Next Pro club Carolina Core FC.

== Career ==
Zeegers started playing football with Geulsche Boys alongside his cousin and future MVV teammate, Lars Schenk. Zeegers made his professional debut for MVV as a starter on 30 August 2020, the first matchday of the 2020–21 Eerste Divisie season, in a 0–0 away draw against Almere City.

On 24 May 2022, Zeegers signed a contract extension with MVV, keeping him in Maastricht until 2023, with an option for an additional year. He extended his contract once again on 23 June 2023, penning a two-year deal keeping him at MVV until 2025. He left the club as his contract expired in June 2025.

== Personal life ==
Besides football, Zeegers has worked as a taxi driver for children in special education. He has also studied applied psychology, which he pursued during a period in which he was injured.

== Career statistics ==
As of match played 22 November 2024

Appearances and goals by club, season and competition
Club	Season	League			KNVB Cup		Other		Total	
Club	Season	Division	Apps	Goals	Apps	Goals	Apps	Goals	Apps	Goals
MVV	2020–21	Eerste Divisie	31	0	1	0	—		32	0
MVV	2021–22	Eerste Divisie	17	0	1	0	—		18	0
MVV	2022–23	Eerste Divisie	21	0	1	0	1 (Note: Appearance in Eredivisie promotion/relegation playoffs)	0	23	0
MVV	2023–24	Eerste Divisie	23	0	1	0	—		24	0
MVV	2024–25	Eerste Divisie	12	0	0	0	—		12	0
Career total			104	0	4	0	1	0	109	0
