= Maurice Verberne =

Dutch football manager (born 1971)

Personal information
- Date of birth: 12 June 1971 (age 55)
- Place of birth: Beek en Donk, Netherlands
- Position: Centre-back

Youth career
- 1978–1990: Sparta '25
- 1990–1992: Helmond Sport

Senior career*
Years	Team	Apps	(Gls)
1992–1994	Helmond Sport	24	(2)
1994–1995	Den Bosch	22	(3)
1995–1996	Helmond Sport	26	(0)
1996–2000	RBC	83	(1)
2001	TOP Oss	17	(0)
2001–2004	ADO Den Haag	53	(3)
2004	→ MVV (loan)	22	(1)
2004–2005	MVV	26	(0)
Total		273	(10)

Managerial career
- 2010: MVV (interim)
- 2018–2019: RKVV Brabantia
- 2020: Roda JC (interim)
- 2021–2022: RKSV Nuenen
- 2022–2024: MVV
- 2024–2026: Eindhoven
- * Club domestic league appearances and goals

Maurice Verberne (born 12 June 1971) is a Dutch professional football manager and former player who played as a centre-back.

He spent his playing career in Dutch professional football with Helmond Sport, Den Bosch, RBC, TOP Oss, ADO Den Haag and MVV. After retiring, he moved into coaching, working in assistant and interim roles before becoming head coach of MVV in 2022 and later FC Eindhoven in 2024.

== Playing career ==
Verberne was born on 12 June 1971 in Beek en Donk, North Brabant, Netherlands. He began playing football at the age of seven in the youth setup of Sparta '25 before joining the Helmond Sport youth academy. He made his professional debut for Helmond Sport on 24 October 1992, in an away match against AZ, coming on as a substitute for Peter Geurts. Over the course of his career, he also played for Den Bosch, RBC, TOP Oss, and ADO Den Haag, before concluding his professional career in 2005 with MVV. In total, he made 295 competitive appearances and scored 10 goals.

Following his retirement from professional football, Verberne played for RIOS '31 in Echt for two seasons. From 2007 to November 2010, he was with Dijkse Boys, helping the team achieve promotion to the Topklasse in 2010.

== Coaching career ==
=== Assistant and interim roles ===
After retiring as a player, Verberne began his coaching career at MVV as an assistant and youth coach. In early 2010, he briefly served as interim head coach. From 2013 to 2018, he worked as an assistant coach at Eindhoven. In January 2019, he joined NAC Breda in the same capacity but was removed from the technical staff following the dismissal of head coach Mitchell van der Gaag in March 2019. From 2018 to 2019, he also coached amateur club RKVV Brabantia.

In the 2019–20 season, Verberne became an assistant coach to Jean-Paul de Jong at Roda JC. After De Jong's dismissal, Verberne served as interim head coach for five matches before being succeeded by René Trost. However, Trost did not oversee any matches due to the COVID-19 pandemic. Verberne's contract with Roda JC expired on 1 June 2020, when newly appointed head coach Jurgen Streppel brought in a new assistant coach.

=== MVV ===
In 2021, Verberne returned to MVV as assistant coach. During this time, he also served as head coach of amateur club RKSV Nuenen. On 29 March 2022, he took over as interim head coach following Klaas Wels' dismissal, leading the team for the remainder of the 2021–22 season. He subsequently signed a one-year contract as MVV's head coach, with an option for a second year, to become MVV's manager on a permanent basis.

=== Eindhoven ===
After MVV Maastricht opted not to renew Verberne's contract at the end of the 2023–24 season, he moved to FC Eindhoven in June 2024 as head coach. In his first season in charge, Eindhoven recovered from a disappointing previous campaign to finish 11th in the 2024–25 Eerste Divisie.

Eindhoven opened the following season with a win over Jong Utrecht and briefly led the table, but their form then deteriorated sharply. By mid-October 2025, the club had taken only two points from its previous eight league matches and had fallen to 15th place in the Eerste Divisie. His second season was further disrupted in October 2025 when he broke his leg during training. Jan Poortvliet initially took over during his recovery, and in January 2026 signed a contract until the end of the season while Verberne remained in rehabilitation. The following month, FC Eindhoven announced that Verberne would not resume his duties and had been placed on leave until the expiry of his contract, with the club citing the "new dynamic" that had emerged within the staff and squad during his prolonged absence.

== Managerial statistics ==
As of match played 24 October 2025

Managerial record by team and tenure
Team	From	To	Record								Ref.
Team	From	To	G	W	D	L	GF	GA	GD	Win %	Ref.
MVV (interim)	3 February 2010	12 March 2010	8	1	5	2	8	15	−7	12.50	
Roda JC (interim)	5 February 2020	6 March 2020	4	1	0	3	6	9	−3	25.00	
MVV	30 March 2022	30 June 2024	86	37	15	34	141	147	−6	43.02	
Eindhoven	1 June 2024	19 February 2026	54	18	11	25	75	96	−21	33.33	
Total			152	57	31	64	230	267	−37	37.50	—
