= Nicky Souren =

Curaçaoan footballer (born 1999)

Personal information
- Full name: Nicky Joël Jari Souren
- Date of birth: 18 December 1999 (age 26)
- Place of birth: Rotterdam, Netherlands
- Height: 1.73 m (5 ft 8 in)
- Position: Midfielder

Team information
- Current team: Cambuur
- Number: 8

Youth career
- 2006–2007: VV Eijsden
- 2007–2017: Roda JC

Senior career*
| Years | Team | Apps | (Gls) |
| 2017–2021 | Roda JC | 56 | (2) |
| 2021–2024 | MVV | 98 | (8) |
| 2024– | Cambuur | 72 | (2) |

International career^{‡}
| 2015 | Netherlands U16 | 3 | (0) |
| 2015 | Netherlands U17 | 2 | (0) |
| 2024– | Curaçao | 4 | (0) |
- * Club domestic league appearances and goals as of 19 September 2026 ‡ National team caps and goals as of 23:01, 1 October 2026 (UTC)

Nicky Joël Jari Souren (born 18 December 1999) is a professional footballer who plays as a midfielder for Eredivisie club Cambuur. Born in the Netherlands, he plays for the Curaçao national team.

== Club career ==
=== Roda JC ===
Souren was born in Rotterdam, but grew up in his mother's hometown of Eijsden after his parents divorced. After having played one season for local club VV Eijsden, he progressed through the Roda JC academy. In the second half of the 2017–18 Eredivisie season, he was included in the matchday squad of the first team on several occasions, but did not yet make his debut. He signed a contract with the club until 2020 on 21 March 2018. At the end of the season, Roda suffered relegation to the Eerste Divisie.

He made his Eerste Divisie debut for Roda on 14 October 2018, starting in a 3–0 away loss to Go Ahead Eagles. On 30 November 2018, Souren scored his first goal, volleying home in a 5–0 away win over TOP Oss.

Souren made a total of 60 appearances for Roda between 2017 and 2021, scoring twice.

=== MVV ===
On 25 August 2021, Souren signed a one-year contract with an option for an additional year with MVV, making the move alongside teammate Mart Remans. He made his debut for the club two days later, starting in a 5–0 away loss to Volendam. He impressed during his first season with MVV and grew into an key player in midfield, extending his contract with the club by another season on 29 April 2022.

Souren scored his first goal for MVV on 29 August 2022 in a 2–2 away draw against Heracles Almelo.

=== Cambuur ===
On 28 May 2024, Cambuur announced an agreement for the signing of Souren on a three-year deal, to be effective as of 1 July 2024. In a subsequent interview he described the move as "very special", recalling that his late grandfather had urged him to play under head coach Henk de Jong.

Souren was appointed club captain ahead of the 2024–25 campaign following the departure of Daniël van Kaam. He made his competitive debut on the opening match‑day, 9 August 2024, starting in a 1–0 away win over former side MVV but leaving shortly before half‑time with an injury. In September he relinquished the armband to Mark Diemers, explaining that he wished to focus on regaining form and that Diemers was assisting him in that process.

== International career ==
Souren made his international debut on 13 March 2015 for the Netherlands under-16 team, starting in a 4–0 friendly win over Republic of Ireland. He gained three caps at under-16 level. In December 2015, he was called up for Netherlands under-17 friendlies but was ruled out due to injury. He made a total of five appearances for the Netherlands youth national sides. He was first called up to the Curaçao national team in May 2024.

== Personal life ==
Souren is a Christian.

== Career statistics ==
=== Club ===
As of match played 19 September 2026

Appearances and goals by club, season and competition
| Club | Season | League | | | KNVB Cup | | Other | | Total | |
| Club | Season | Division | Apps | Goals | Apps | Goals | Apps | Goals | Apps | Goals |
|---|---|---|---|---|---|---|---|---|---|---|
| Roda JC | 2018–19 | Eerste Divisie | 26 | 2 | 2 | 0 | — | | 28 | 2 |
| Roda JC | 2019–20 | Eerste Divisie | 22 | 0 | 2 | 0 | — | | 24 | 0 |
| Roda JC | 2020–21 | Eerste Divisie | 7 | 0 | 0 | 0 | 0 | 0 | 7 | 0 |
| Roda JC | 2021–22 | Eerste Divisie | 1 | 0 | 0 | 0 | — | | 1 | 0 |
| Roda JC | Total | | 56 | 2 | 4 | 0 | 0 | 0 | 60 | 2 |
| MVV | 2021–22 | Eerste Divisie | 29 | 0 | 2 | 0 | — | | 31 | 0 |
| MVV | 2022–23 | Eerste Divisie | 33 | 6 | 1 | 0 | 2 (Note: Appearances in Eredivisie promotion/relegation playoffs) | 0 | 36 | 6 |
| MVV | 2023–24 | Eerste Divisie | 36 | 2 | 1 | 0 | — | | 37 | 2 |
| MVV | Total | | 98 | 8 | 4 | 0 | 2 | 0 | 104 | 8 |
| Cambuur | 2024–25 | Eerste Divisie | 35 | 0 | 2 | 0 | 1 | 0 | 38 | 0 |
| Cambuur | 2025–26 | Eerste Divisie | 30 | 2 | 1 | 0 | — | | 31 | 2 |
| Cambuur | 2026–27 | Eredivisie | 7 | 0 | 0 | 0 | — | | 7 | 0 |
| Cambuur | Total | | 72 | 2 | 3 | 0 | 1 | 0 | 76 | 2 |
| Career total | | | 226 | 12 | 11 | 0 | 3 | 0 | 240 | 12 |

=== International ===
As of match played 1 October 2026

Appearances and goals by national team and year
| National team | Year | Apps | Goals |
|---|---|---|---|
| Curaçao | 2024 | 1 | 0 |
| Curaçao | 2026 | 3 | 0 |
| Total | | 4 | 0 |
