= Mart Remans =

Dutch footballer (born 1998)

Personal information
- Date of birth: 21 June 1998 (age 28)
- Place of birth: Eygelshoven, Netherlands
- Height: 1.76 m (5 ft 9 in)
- Position: Winger

Team information
- Current team: Belisia Bilzen

Youth career
- Laura Hopel Combinatie
- –2018: Roda JC

Senior career*
Years	Team	Apps	(Gls)
2018–2021	Roda JC	46	(7)
2020–2021	→ TOP Oss (loan)	23	(11)
2021–2024	MVV	94	(20)
2024–2026	TOP Oss	61	(8)
2026–	Belisia Bilzen	0	(0)
- * Club domestic league appearances and goals as of 28 April 2026

Mart Remans (born 21 June 1998) is a Dutch professional footballer who plays as a winger for Belgian Division 1 club Belisia Bilzen.

== Career ==
=== Roda JC ===
Remans was born in Eygelshoven, part of Kerkrade, Limburg, and began playing football for Laura Hopel Combinatie. Shortly after he moved to the Roda JC academy.

Remans made his Eerste Divisie debut for Roda on 17 August 2018 in a game against Jong Ajax, replacing Mitchel Paulissen in the 93rd minute. On 14 December 2018, he scored his first professional goal, opening the score in a 2–1 league victory against Volendam.

In October 2020, he was sent on a one-season loan to Eerste Divisie rivals TOP Oss.

=== MVV ===
On 25 August 2021, it was announced that Remans had signed a three-year contract with provincial rivals MVV, making the move alongside Roda JC teammate Nicky Souren. He made his debut for the club two days later, starting in a 5–0 away loss to Volendam. On 5 September, he scored his first goals for the club, bagging a first-half brace in a 3–0 victory against Telstar.

On 18 March 2022, Remans scored a spectacular goal from his own half. With 1–1 the score, Remans noticed that De Graafschap's goalkeeper Hidde Jurjus was standing a long way out of his goal, and hit a shot from before the halfway line that floated over the goalkeeper and into the net. The goal helped MVV to the lead as they won 3–1.

=== TOP Oss ===
On 26 June 2024, Remans agreed to rejoin Eerste Divisie club TOP Oss on a two-year deal from the expiration of his contract with MVV.

== Career statistics ==
As of match played 8 August 2025

Appearances and goals by club, season and competition
Club	Season	League			KNVB Cup		Other		Total	
Club	Season	Division	Apps	Goals	Apps	Goals	Apps	Goals	Apps	Goals
Roda JC	2018–19	Eerste Divisie	26	6	2	0	—		28	6
Roda JC	2019–20	Eerste Divisie	14	1	1	0	—		15	1
Roda JC	2020–21	Eerste Divisie	4	0	0	0	0	0	4	0
Roda JC	2021–22	Eerste Divisie	2	0	0	0	—		2	0
Roda JC	Total		46	7	3	0	0	0	49	7
TOP Oss (loan)	2020–21	Eerste Divisie	23	11	1	0	—		24	11
MVV	2021–22	Eerste Divisie	32	8	2	3	—		34	11
MVV	2022–23	Eerste Divisie	29	5	1	0	1 (Note: Appearance(s) in Eredivisie promotion/relegation playoffs)	0	31	5
MVV	2023–24	Eerste Divisie	33	7	1	0	—		34	7
MVV	Total		94	20	4	3	1	0	99	23
TOP Oss	2024–25	Eerste Divisie	27	0	1	0	—		28	0
TOP Oss	2025–26	Eerste Divisie	1	2	0	0	—		1	2
TOP Oss	Total		28	2	1	0	—		29	2
Career total			191	40	9	3	1	0	201	43
