= 2025 Chattanooga FC season =

Chattanooga FC
2025 season
- Owner: Thomas Clark; Sheldon Grizzle
- Chairman: David Grizzard
- Head coach: Chris Nugent
- Stadium: Finley Stadium
- MLSNP: Southeast Division: Eastern Conference: MLSNP:
- 2025 U.S. Open Cup: Second Round
- Top goalscorer: League: (United States) Tate Robertson (9 goals); All: (United States) Daniel Mangarov (United States) Tate Robertson (9 goals each)
- Highest home attendance: 4,532 October 5 vs Atlanta United 2, 12,131 April 2 vs Chattanooga Red Wolves SC (US Open Cup)
- Lowest home attendance: 2,752 May 24 vs New England Revolution II, 2,075 March 19 vs Corpus Christi FC (US Open Cup)
- Average home league attendance: 3,423 (3 games missing), With US Open Cup 3,990 (3 games missing)
- Biggest win: Carolina Core FC 1–4 Chattanooga FC; April 13
- Biggest defeat: New York Red Bulls II 5–2 Chattanooga FC June 15
- All statistics correct as of 19:59, July 5, 2025 (UTC).

The 2025 Chattanooga season is the club's seventeenth season. It is the second season in MLS Next Pro and the second with independent teams with the Carolina Core. The first eleven seasons Chattanooga FC competed as an amateur team in National Premier Soccer League. Chattanooga FC was a successful amateur team, winning the NPSL season champion eight times and finish second in post-season playoffs four times. Last season Chattanooga FC missed the playoffs on decision day.

== Technical staff ==
Technical staff
Head coach	(Republic of Ireland) Christopher Nugent
Assistant coach	(England) Adam Reekie
Director of Goalkeeping Assistant Coach	(Colombia) Juan Carlos "JC" Garzon
Director of soccer operations	(United States) Jordan Mattheiss

=== Current roster ===
As of July 31, 2025

No.	Pos.	Nation	Player
1	GK	SUI	Eldin Jakupović
2	DF	USA	Robert Screen
3	DF	USA	Tate Robertson
4	DF	USA	Logan Brown
5	DF	ARG	Farid Sar-Sar
7	MF	ALG	Ameziane Sid Mohand
8	MF	ENG	Callum Watson
9	MF	DEN	Peter Plougmand
10	FW	NOR	Markus Naglestad
11	MF	KOR	Min-jae Kwak
12	FW	CAN	Xavier Rimpel
14	DF	USA	Nathan Koehler
15	MF	HAI	Steeve Louis-Jean
16	MF	USA	Daniel Mangarov
17	MF	HON	Darwin Ortiz
19	MF	USA	Colin Thomas
20	DF	USA	Ethan Dudley
22	DF	USA	Milo Garvanian
25	GK	USA	J. P. Philpot
26	FW	USA	Keegan Ancelin
27	MF	USA	Nick Mendonca
33	MF	ENG	Alex McGrath
48	DF	USA	Gavin Turner
51	GK	USA	Michael Barrueta
71	MF	USA	Jalen James
99	DF	USA	Mike Bleeker

Chattanooga FC Academy player.

== Transfers ==
=== In ===
Date	Position	No.	Name	From	Fee	Ref.
November 14, 2024	GK	1	(Switzerland) Eldin Jakupović	(United States) Los Angeles FC	One-year Deal	
November 18, 2024	FW	10	(Norway) Markus Naglestad	(United States) Chattanooga FC	re-signing to a one-year deal	
December 5, 2024	MF	17	(Honduras) Darwin Ortiz	(United States) Southern Soccer Academy	signing	
December 10, 2024	MF	15	(Haiti) Steeve Louis Jean	(United States) Austin FC II	Free agent	
December 17, 2024	FW	7	(Algeria) Ameziane Sid Mohand	(United States) Columbus Crew 2	one-year deal	
December 20, 2024	MF	11	(South Korea) Min-jae Kwak	(United States) Chattanooga FC	re-signing	
December 21, 2024	DF	3	(United States) Tate Robertson	(United States) Lexington SC	Free agent	
January 6, 2025	FW	58	(United States) Jesus Ibarra	(United States) Chattanooga FC	re-signing	
January 7, 2025	MF	27	(United States) Nick Mendoca	(United States) North Texas SC	Free agent	
January 15, 2025	FW	9	(Denmark) Peter Plougmand	(United States) Mars Hill Lions	Free agent	
January 29, 2025	DF	20	(United States) Ethan Dudley	(United States) Atlanta United 2	signing	
January 30, 2025	MF	16	(United States) Daniel Mangarov	(United States) Virginia Cavaliers	signing	
January 31, 2025	GK	25	(United States) J.P. Philpot	(United States) Birmingham Legion	signing	
February 1, 2025	FW	26	(United States) Keegan Ancelin	(United States) West Florida Argonauts	signing	
March 14, 2025	DF	14	(United States) Nathan Koehler	(England) Prescot Cables	signing	
April 4, 2025	MF	19	(United States) Colin Thomas	(United States) Wake Forest Demon Deacons	signing	
April 29, 2025	DF	99	(United States) Mike Bleeker	(United States) Vermont Catamounts	signing	
July 1, 2025	MF	48	(United States) Gavin Turner	(United States) DC United	Loan	
July 8, 2025	FW	12	(Canada) Xavier Rimpel	(United States) Temple Owls	signing	
August 11, 2025	MF	18	(United States) Luke Husakiwsky	(United States) Des Moines Menace	signing	
August 15, 2025	FW	97	(United States) Anthony Garcia	(United States) Austin FC II	signing	
August 19, 2025	FW	90	(United States) Yuval Cohen	(United States) Inter Miami CF Academy	signing	

=== Loan In ===
No.	Pos.	Player	Loaned from	Start	End	Source
48	DF	(United States) Gavin Turner	(United States) DC United	July 1, 2025	December 31, 2025	

=== Out ===
Date	Position	No.	Name	To	Type	Fee	Ref.
October 21, 2024	GK	15	(Haiti) Jean Antoine		Released	N/A	
October 21, 2024	GK	32	(United States) Jon Burke		Released	N/A	
October 21, 2024	MF	10	(Mexico) Luis Garcia Sosa		Released	N/A	
October 21, 2024	FW	11	(United States) Taylor Gray	(United States) Tormenta FC	Released	N/A	
October 21, 2024	FW	58	(United States) Jesus Ibarra		Released, then re-signed with the team	N/A	
October 21, 2024	MF	8	(United States) Andres Jimenez Aranzazu	(Puerto Rico) Ponce FC	Released	N/A	
October 21, 2024	MF	12	(United States) Ethan Koren	(Sweden) AFC Eskilstuna	Released	N/A	
October 21, 2024	MF	18	(South Korea) Min-jae Kwak		Released, then re-signed with the team	N/A	
October 21, 2024	FW	99	(Norway) Markus Naglestad		Released, then re-signed with the team	N/A	
October 21, 2024	DF	3	(United States) Joseph Patrick Pérez	(United States) Tormenta FC	Released	N/A	
October 21, 2024	DF	5	(Moldova) Anatolie Prepeliță	(United States) Tormenta FC	Released	N/A	
October 21, 2024	MF	7	(United States) Damian Rodriguez		Released	N/A	
October 21, 2024	DF	20	(Colombia) Duvan Viafara		Released	N/A	
January 6, 2025	DF	23	(Trinidad and Tobago) Jesse Williams		mutual termination of Contract	N/A	
January 10, 2025	FW	9	(France) Mehdi Ouamri	(United States) Union Omaha	mutual termination of Contract	N/A	
January 28, 2025	MF	25	(Ghana) Jude Arthur	(Georgia (country)) FC Samgurali Tskaltubo	mutual termination of Contract	N/A	
July 31, 2025	FW	58	(United States) Jesus Ibarra	(United States) Carolina Core FC	mutual termination of Contract	N/A	

== Non-competitive fixtures ==
=== Preseason ===
January 25	Chattanooga FC	2–1	Atlanta United	Chattanooga, Tennessee
3:00 pm EST	Ibarra 82'; Trialist 87'	Report	Wynne 80'	Stadium: Finley Stadium; Attendance: 4,109

February 8	Birmingham Legion FC	2–3	Chattanooga FC	Birmingham, Alabama
4:30 pm EST	Damus 30'		Sid Mohand 32', 47'; Screen 67'	Stadium: Protective Stadium; Attendance: Behind Closed Doors

February 15	Chattanooga FC	1–1	One Knoxville SC	Chattanooga, Tennessee
3:00 pm EST	Ancelin 67'		Fernandez 50'	Stadium: Finley Stadium

February 22	Chattanooga FC	1–0	North Carolina Tar Heels	Chattanooga, Tennessee
3:00 pm EST	Robertson 33'			Stadium: Finley Stadium

February 28	Chattanooga FC	5–1	Tennessee Tempo	Chattanooga, Tennessee
3:00 pm EST	Ancelin 8'; Ibarra 24'; Watson 45+2', 58'; Plougmand 86'	Report	68'	Stadium: Finley Stadium

== Competitive fixtures ==
=== League ===
==== Match results ====
March 8 1	Inter Miami CF II	1–2	Chattanooga FC	Fort Lauderdale, Florida
	Abadia-Reda 6'; Ristano (yellow card) 30'; Basabe (yellow card) 72'	Report	Ancelin 3'; Garvanian 56'; Watson (yellow card) 72'	Stadium: Chase Stadium; Referee: Edson Carvajal

March 15 2	Chattanooga FC	1–0	Huntsville City FC	Chattanooga, Tennessee
7:00 PM EDT	Mangarov 3'; Kwak (yellow card) 40'; Watson (yellow card) 48'	Report	Gaines (yellow card) 35'; Barrett (yellow card) 54'	Stadium: Finley Stadium; Referee: Amin Hadzic

March 30 3	Atlanta United 2	2–2 (3–4 p)	Chattanooga FC	Kennesaw, Georgia
7:30 PM EDT	Neri 78', 90+4'	Report	Morales 64' (o.g.); Ancelin 86'	Stadium: Fifth Third Bank Stadium; Attendance: 297; Referee: Corbyn May
	Penalties
	Armas (penalty scored); Togashi (penalty missed); Neri (penalty scored); Cobb (penalty scored); Brennan (penalty missed)		(penalty scored) Naglestad; (penalty scored) Sar-Sar; (penalty scored) Screen; (penalty missed) Mendonca; (penalty scored) Mangarov

April 5 4	Chattanooga FC	2–0	Orlando City B	Chattanooga, Tennessee
7:00 PM EDT	Sar-Sar (yellow card) 51'; Mangarov 77'; Ancelin 84'	Report		Stadium: Finley Stadium; Referee: Muhammad Kaleia

April 13 5	Carolina Core FC	1–4	Chattanooga FC	High Point, North Carolina
3:00 PM EDT	Covi (yellow card) 10' (yellow-red card) 47'; Rodríguez (yellow card) 17'; Polanco 18' (yellow card) 72'; Leonardi (yellow card) 45+4'; Sutton (yellow card) 62'; Cambindo (yellow card) 84'	Report	Covi 13' (o.g.); Mendonca (yellow card) 25'; Sar-Sar 34'; Robertson 53'; Koehler (yellow card) 62'; Plougman 79'	Stadium: Truist Point; Attendance: 3,710; Referee: Josiah Parke

April 19 6	Chattanooga FC	2–1	Crown Legacy FC	Chattanooga, Tennessee
7:00 PM EDT	Garvanian (yellow card) 17'; Plougmand 51'; Ibarra 58'; Watson (yellow card) 73'; Jakupović (yellow card) 90+3'	Report	Smalls 21'; Smith (yellow card) 60'	Stadium: Finley Stadium; Attendance: 3,246; Referee: Kyle Johnston

April 27 7	Columbus Crew 2	3–0	Chattanooga FC	Columbus, Ohio
3:00 PM EDT	Brown 45'; Adams 68'; Ortiz 86'	Report	Sar-Sar (yellow card) 63'; Robertson (yellow card) 88'	Stadium: Historic Crew Stadium; Referee: Calin Radosav

May 3 8	Chattanooga FC	0–0 (8–9 p)	Philadelphia Union II	Chattanooga, Tennessee
7:00 PM EDT	Robertson (yellow card) 66'			Stadium: Finley Stadium; Referee: Celeste Roberts
	Penalties
	Robertson (penalty scored); Kwak (penalty missed); Mendonca (penalty missed); Plougmand (penalty scored); Watson (penalty scored); Mangarov (penalty scored); Brown (penalty scored); Sar-Sar (penalty scored); Ancelin (penalty missed); Koehler (penalty scored); Jakupović (penalty scored); Robertson (penalty missed)		(penalty scored) Pariano; (penalty scored) Kornzeniowski; (penalty missed) LeFlore; (penalty missed) Uzcátegui; (penalty scored) Soria; (penalty scored) Sequera; (penalty scored) Bernstein; (penalty scored) Davis; (penalty missed) Wetzel; (penalty scored) Cobo; (penalty scored) Rick; (penalty scored) Pariano

May 9 9	Toronto FC II	1–2	Chattanooga FC	North York, Toronto, Ontario
7:00 PM EDT	Chisholm (yellow card) 35'; Barrow (yellow card) 82'; Nolan 88'	Report	Plougmand 11'; Kwak 44'; Watson (yellow card) 79'	Stadium: York Lions Stadium; Referee: Thomas Noel

May 17 10	Huntsville City FC	1–2	Chattanooga FC	Huntsville, Alabama
8:00 PM EDT	Carleton 48'; Valdez (yellow card) 64'	Report	Koehler 63'; James (yellow card) 79'; Mangarov 84'; Ancelin (yellow card) 90+6'	Stadium: Wicks Family Field at Joe Davis Stadium; Attendance: 4,985; Referee: Laith Dahhan

May 24 11	Chattanooga FC	1–0	New England Revolution II	Chattanooga, Tennessee
7:00 PM EDT	Plougmand 11'; Ortiz (yellow card) 28'; Robertson (yellow card) 87'	Report	Barry (yellow card) 58'; Oliveira (yellow card) 80'	Stadium: Finley Stadium; Attendance: 2,752; Referee: Alejo Calume

June 1 12	Orlando City B	2–1	Chattanooga FC	Kissimmee, Florida
7:00 PM EDT	Mohammed 12' (yellow card) 40'; Sargis (yellow card) 70'; Caraballo (yellow card) 75'; Solís (yellow card) 81'; Levis 90+1'	Report	Ortiz (yellow card) 19'; Louis-Jean 43'; Watson (yellow card) 69'; Sar-Sar (yellow card) 83'; Mangarov (yellow card) 85'	Stadium: Osceola Heritage Park; Referee: Mario Maric

June 7 13	Chattanooga FC	3–3 (5–4 p)	Inter Miami CF II	Chattanooga, Tennessee
7:00 PM EDT	Robertson 27' (pen.); Mangarov 54'; James 80'	Report	Zeltzer-Zubida 7', 20'; Saja 33'; Sparks (yellow card) 68'; Pintér (yellow card) 79'; Marin (yellow card) FT	Stadium: Finley Stadium; Attendance: 3,361; Referee: Gary Gutierrez
	Penalties
	Naglestad (penalty scored); Robertson (penalty scored); Mangarov (penalty scored); James (penalty scored); Sar-Sar (penalty scored)		(penalty missed) Montenegro; (penalty scored) Ferraina; (penalty scored) Sumalla; (penalty scored) Pintér; (penalty scored) Plambeck

June 15 14	New York Red Bulls II	5–2	Chattanooga FC	Montclair, New Jersey
7:00 PM EDT	Benedetti 14'; Gutierrez 44'; Mosquera 45+3', 49'; Stokes (yellow card) 55'; Collahuazo (yellow card) 67'; Rosborough 90+7'	Report	Watson (yellow card) 33' (yellow-red card) 82'; Koehler (yellow card) 48'; Robertson 56' (pen.) (yellow card) 62'; Garvanian 68'; Louis-Jean (yellow card) 89'	Stadium: MSU Soccer Park; Referee: Alex Beehler

June 21 15	Chattanooga FC	0–0 (7–8 p)	FC Cincinnati 2	Chattanooga, Tennessee
7:00 PM EDT	James (yellow card) 29'; Screen (yellow card) 47'; Garvinian (yellow card) 49'; Sar-Sar (yellow card) 90+5'	Report	Daley (yellow card) 66'	Stadium: Finley Stadium; Attendance: 3,106; Referee: Habeeb Hooshmand
	Penalties
	Naglestad (penalty scored); Robertson (penalty scored); Garvinian (penalty scored); Kawk (penalty scored); Sar-Sar (penalty scored); Ibarra (penalty scored); Dudley (penalty scored); Louis Jean (penalty missed)		(penalty scored) Ikoba; (penalty scored) Schaefer; (penalty scored) Augee; (penalty scored) Locker; (penalty scored) Adnan; (penalty scored) Jimenez; (penalty scored) Daley; (penalty scored) Chirilă

July 5 16	Chattanooga FC	0–1	Chicago Fire FC II	Chattanooga, Tennessee
7:00 PM EDT	Koehler (yellow card) 45+1'	Report	Osorio (yellow card) 10'; Shokalook 52'; Fleming III (yellow card) 90+4'	Stadium: Finley Stadium; Attendance: 2,822; Referee: Tim Wagner

July 13 17	Philadelphia Union II	3–3 (6–5 p)	Chattanooga FC	Chester, Pennsylvania
3:00 PM EDT	Sullivan 18', 86'; Sequera (yellow card) 53'; Rick (yellow card) 64'; Jakupovic 84'	Report	Robertson (yellow card) 36'; Sar-Sar (yellow card) 42'; Turner 45+6'; James 57'; Robertson 67'; Watson (yellow card) 90+3'	Stadium: Subaru Park; Referee: Atahan Yaya
	Penalties
	Vazquez (penalty scored); Pierre (penalty scored); Soria (penalty missed); Jakupovic (penalty scored); Sullivan (penalty scored); Ferreira (penalty scored); Pariano (penalty scored)		(penalty scored) Naglestad; (penalty scored) Robertson; (penalty missed) Screen; (penalty scored) Dudley; (penalty scored) Sar-Sar; (penalty scored) Garvanian; (penalty missed) Mendonca

July 19 18	Chattanooga FC	2–2 (5–4 p)	Inter Miami CF II	Chattanooga, Tennessee
7:00 PM EDT	Mangarov 45', 52'; Mendonca (yellow card) 90+2'; Jakupović (yellow card) 90+5'	Report	Hall (yellow card) 27'; Saja 30'; Pintér 57'; Ferraina (yellow card) 61'; Ledesma (yellow card) 90'; Marin (yellow card) 90+4' (yellow card) PSO	Stadium: Finley Stadium; Attendance: 4,072; Referee: Arman Becan
	Penalties
	Jakupović (penalty missed); Dudley (penalty scored); Sid Mohand (penalty missed); Kwak (penalty scored); Sar-Sar (penalty scored); Garvanian (penalty scored); Rimpel (penalty scored)		(penalty missed) Sumalla; (penalty missed) Ferraina; (penalty scored) Almeida; (penalty scored) Pintér; (penalty scored) Saja; (penalty scored) Sparks; (penalty missed) Ristano

July 26 19	Chattanooga FC	1–3	Crown Legacy FC	Chattanooga, Tennessee
7:00 PM EDT	Ancelin (yellow card) 50'; Robertson 79' (yellow card) 90+7'; Turner (yellow card) 90'	Report	Tonidandel (yellow card) 19'; Uchegbu 29'; Sing 45+4'; Tcheuyap (yellow card) 90+5'; Subotić 90+9'	Stadium: Finley Stadium; Attendance: 3,069; Referee: Adam Rice

August 2 20	Chattanooga FC	1–2	Toronto FC II	Chattanooga, Tennessee
7:00 PM EDT	Mendonca (yellow card) 39'; Naglestad 45'; Jakupović (yellow card) 47'; Koehler (yellow card) 76'; Sid Mohand (yellow card) 89'	Report	Cimermancic 49'; Ayari 73'; Fisher (yellow card) 87'	Stadium: Finley Stadium; Attendance: 3,377; Referee: Taylor Bowen

August 9 21	Orlando City B	2–2 (2–4 p)	Chattanooga FC	Kissimmee, Florida
7:33 PM EDT	Rhein (yellow card) 56' (yellow-red card) 58'; Tori (yellow card) 60'; Thalles 77'; Caraballo (yellow card) 89'; Mohammed 90+2'	Report	Ancelin (yellow card) 14'; Koehler 46', 90+7'; James (yellow card) 55'; Louis-Jean (yellow card) 80'	Stadium: Osceola Heritage Park; Referee: Benjamin Meyer
	Penalties
	Ellis (penalty missed); Caraballo (penalty scored); Platts (penalty missed); Mohammed (penalty scored)		(penalty scored) Robertson; (penalty scored) Rimpel; (penalty scored) Garvanian; (penalty missed) Watson; (penalty scored) Sar-Sar

August 16 22	Carolina Core FC	0–1	Chattanooga FC	High Point, North Carolina
7:30 PM EDT	Covi (yellow card) 79' (yellow-red card) 87'	Report	Mendonca (yellow card) 45+1'; Ancelin (yellow card) 69'; Robertson 88' (pen.); Turner (yellow card) 90+7'	Stadium: Truist Point; Attendance: 4,477; Referee: Iryna Petrunok

August 23 23	Chattanooga FC	1–0	Huntsville City FC	Chattanooga, Tennessee
7:00 PM EDT	Husakiwsky 22' (yellow card) 30'; Mendonca (yellow card) 45'	Report	Mayaka (yellow card) 76'; Barker John (yellow card) 81'	Stadium: Finley Stadium; Attendance: 3,266; Referee: Gerald Flores

September 12 24	Crown Legacy FC	2–4	Chattanooga FC	Matthews, North Carolina
7:00 PM EDT	Thomas 5'; Sing 51'	Report	Robertson (yellow card) 20' (goal) 86' (pen.); García (yellow card) 29'; Husakiwsky 54'; Agyemang 80' (o.g.); Mangarov 90+2'	Stadium: Mecklenburg County Sportsplex; Referee: Wes Caouette

September 21 25	Chattanooga FC	0–0 (5–6 p)	Carolina Core FC	Chattanooga, Tennessee
7:00 PM EDT	Koehler (yellow card) 35'; Garvianian (yellow card) 44'	Report	Chica (yellow card) 23'; Thomas (yellow card) 62'	Stadium: Finley Stadium; Attendance: 4,055; Referee: Mark Verso
	Penalties
	Robertson (penalty scored); Naglestad (penalty scored); Garvianian (penalty missed); Cohen (penalty scored); Sar-Sar (penalty scored); Mendonca (penalty scored); Brown (penalty missed)		(penalty scored) Evans; (penalty missed) Sutton; (penalty scored) JP Rodriguez; (penalty scored) Thomas; (penalty scored) Nzingo; (penalty scored) Sumo Jr.; (penalty scored) Scarlett

September 28 27	NYCFC II	0–1	Chattanooga FC	New York City, New York
7:30 PM EDT	Elias (yellow card) 86'	Report	Robertson 75'; Turner (yellow card) 88'	Stadium: Icahn Stadium; Referee: Cristian Campo Hernandez

October 2 26	Atlanta United 2	0–1	Chattanooga FC	Marietta, Georgia
7:30 PM EDT	Sanchez (yellow card) 45+5'; Wynne (yellow card) 90+1'	Report	Mangarov 11' (yellow card) 45'; Ancelin (yellow card) 29'; Robertson (yellow card) 39'; Garvanian (yellow card) 45+2'	Stadium: Children's Healthcare of Atlanta Training Ground; Referee: Abdou Ndiaye
Note: Match was originally played September 24 at 7:30 PM EDT at Fifth Third Bank Stadium in Kennesaw, Georgia, but suspended at 71st minute with Chattanooga FC leading 1-0 and moved to Children's Healthcare of Atlanta Training Ground in Marietta, Georgia.

October 5 28	Chattanooga FC	1–1 (5–4 p)	Atlanta United 2	Chattanooga, Tennessee
1:00 PM EDT	Mangarov (yellow card) 14'; Cohen 26'; García (yellow card) 45+3'; Sar-Sar (yellow card) 90+4'	Report	Pita 2'; Wynne (yellow card) 49'; Majub (yellow card) 74'	Stadium: Finley Stadium; Attendance: 4,532; Referee: Izlen Peksenar
	Penalties
	Robertson (penalty missed); Mangarov (penalty scored); Rimpel (penalty scored); Watson (penalty scored); Sar-Sar (penalty scored); Turner (penalty scored)		(penalty scored) Weah; (penalty scored) Armas; (penalty scored) Kovac; (penalty missed) Mazzaferro; (penalty scored) Tablante; (penalty missed) Wesseh

==== Playoffs ====
October 19 Conference Quarterfinals	Chattanooga FC	0–2	Huntsville City FC	Chattanooga, Tennessee
7:00 PM EDT	Garcia (yellow card) 22'; Sar-Sar (yellow card) 67'	Report	Carleton (yellow card) 38'; Mayaka 42'; Barker John (yellow card) 54'; Casas (yellow card) 78'	Stadium: Finley Stadium; Attendance: 4,732; Referee: Elvis Osmanovic

==== Lamar Hunt US Open Cup ====
March 19 First Round	Chattanooga FC	1–0 (a.e.t.)	Corpus Christi FC	Chattanooga, Tennessee
6:30 PM ET	Watson (yellow card) 32'; Ancelin (yellow card) 53'; Mangarov (yellow card) 80'; Louis-Jean (yellow card) 86'; Naglestad 112'	Report	Larsson (yellow card) 17'; Medina (yellow card) 47'; Berdugo (yellow card) 69'; Roberts (yellow card) 84'; Barganski (yellow card) 103'	Stadium: Finley Stadium; Attendance: 2,075; Referee: Wes Caouette

April 2 Second Round	Chattanooga FC	1–1 (a.e.t.) (4–5 p)	Chattanooga Red Wolves SC	Chattanooga, Tennessee
7:00 PM ET	Mangarov 19' (yellow card) 90+5'; Watson (yellow card) 21'; Garvanian (yellow card) 38'; Sar-Sar (yellow card) 45+5'; Ibarra (yellow card) 112'; Kwak (yellow card) 119'		Hernandez 7'; Ayimbila (yellow card) 45'; Hernández (yellow card) 62'; Gómez (yellow card) 90+5'; Kinzner (yellow card) 120+1'	Stadium: Finley Stadium; Attendance: 12,131
	Penalties
	Mangarov (penalty missed); Screen (penalty scored); Naglestad (penalty scored); Sar-Sar (penalty scored); Dudley (penalty scored)		(penalty scored) Bentley; (penalty scored) Vazquez; (penalty scored) Filipe; (penalty scored) Hernández; (penalty scored) Green

=== Statistics ===
Numbers after plus-sign(+) denote appearances as a substitute.

==== Appearances and goals ====
No.	Pos	Nat	Player	Total		MLS Next Pro		U.S. Open Cup		MLSNP Playoffs	
No.	Pos	Nat	Player	Apps	Goals	Apps	Goals	Apps	Goals	Apps	Goals
1	GK	(Switzerland) SUI	Eldin Jakupović	31	0	28+0	0	2+0	0	1+0	0
2	DF	(United States) USA	Robert Screen	14	0	5+7	0	0+2	0	0+0	0
3	DF	(United States) USA	Tate Robertson	30	9	26+1	9	2+0	0	1+0	0
4	DF	(United States) USA	Logan Brown	16	0	8+6	0	2+0	0	0+0	0
5	DF	(Argentina) ARG	Farid Sar-Sar	31	1	28+0	1	2+0	0	1+0	0
7	MF	(Algeria) ALG	Ameziane Sid Mohand	5	0	0+4	0	0+0	0	0+1	0
8	MF	(England) ENG	Callum Watson	28	0	24+1	0	2+0	0	1+0	0
9	MF	(Denmark) DEN	Peter Plougmand	13	4	7+5	4	0+1	0	0+0	0
10	FW	(Norway) NOR	Markus Naglestad	19	2	7+10	1	0+2	1	0+0	0
11	MF	(South Korea) KOR	Min-jae Kwak	17	1	7+8	1	0+2	0	0+0	0
12	FW	(Canada) CAN	Xavier Rimpel	7	0	1+6	0	0+0	0	0+0	0
14	DF	(United States) USA	Nathan Koehler	29	3	23+3	3	1+1	0	1+0	0
15	MF	(Haiti) HAI	Steeve Louis-Jean	23	1	9+11	1	2+0	0	0+1	0
16	MF	(United States) USA	Daniel Mangarov	31	9	24+4	8	2+0	1	1+0	0
17	MF	(Honduras) HON	Darwin Ortiz	7	0	3+4	0	0+0	0	0+0	0
18	MF	(United States) USA	Luke Husakiwsky	8	2	6+1	2	0+0	0	1+0	0
19	MF	(United States) USA	Colin Thomas	14	0	7+7	0	0+0	0	0+0	0
20	DF	(United States) USA	Ethan Dudley	19	0	10+7	0	0+2	0	0+0	0
22	DF	(United States) USA	Milo Garvanian	30	2	26+1	2	2+0	0	1+0	0
25	GK	(United States) USA	J. P. Philpot	0	0	0+0	0	0+0	0	0+0	0
26	FW	(United States) USA	Keegan Ancelin	28	3	7+19	3	2+0	0	0+0	0
27	MF	(United States) USA	Nick Mendonca	27	0	17+8	0	2+0	0	0+0	0
33	MF	(England) ENG	Alex McGrath	4	0	3+0	0	1+0	0	0+0	0
48	MF	(United States) USA	Gavin Turner	13	1	9+3	1	0+0	0	1+0	0
51	GK	(United States) USA	Michael Barrueta	0	0	0+0	0	0+0	0	0+0	0
58	FW	(United States) USA	Jesus Ibarra	13	1	6+5	1	0+2	0	0+0	0
71	MF	(United States) USA	Jalen James	14	2	7+7	2	0+0	0	0+0	0
90	FW	(United States) USA	Yuval Cohen	7	1	6+0	1	0+0	0	1+0	0
97	FW	(United States) USA	Anthony Garcia	7	0	4+2	0	0+0	0	1+0	0
99	DF	(United States) USA	Mike Bleeker	2	0	0+2	0	0+0	0	0+0	0

- Last updated: October 19, 2025
- Source: https://www.mlsnextpro.com/clubs/chattanooga-fc/stats/#season=MLS-SEA-0001K9&competition=mls-next-pro&club=MLS-CLU-00003H&statType=general&position=all

==== Top scorers ====
Rank	Position	Number	Name	MLS Next Pro	U.S. Open Cup	MLSNP Playoffs	Total
1	DF	3	(United States) Tate Robertson	9	0	0	9
1	FW	16	(United States) Daniel Mangarov	8	1	0	9
3	MF	9	(Denmark) Peter Plougmand	4	0	0	4
4	DF	14	(United States) Nathan Koehler	3	0	0	3
4	FW	26	(United States) Keegan Ancelin	3	0	0	3
4	Own Goals			3	0	0	3
7	MF	18	(United States) Luke Husakiwsky	2	0	0	2
7	DF	22	(United States) Milo Garvanian	2	0	0	2
7	MF	71	(United States) Jalen James	2	0	0	2
7	FW	10	(Norway) Markus Naglestad	1	1	0	2
11	DF	5	(Argentina) Farid Sar-Sar	1	0	0	1
11	MF	11	(South Korea) Min-jae Kwak	1	0	0	1
11	MF	15	(Haiti) Steeve Louis-Jean	1	0	0	1
11	MF	48	(United States) Gavin Turner	1	0	0	1
11	FW	58	(United States) Jesus Ibarra	1	0	0	1
11	FW	90	(United States) Yuval Cohen	1	0	0	1
Total				42	2	0	44

- Last updated: October 5, 2025
- Source: https://www.mlsnextpro.com/clubs/chattanooga-fc/stats/#season=MLS-SEA-0001K9&competition=mls-next-pro&club=MLS-CLU-00003H&statType=general&position=all

==== Top assists ====
Rank	Position	Number	Name	MLS Next Pro	U.S. Open Cup	MLSNP Playoffs	Total
1	DF	3	(United States) Tate Robertson	10	0	0	10
2	FW	16	(United States) Daniel Mangarov	5	0	0	5
3	MF	9	(Denmark) Peter Plougmand	2	0	0	2
3	FW	26	(United States) Keegan Ancelin	2	0	0	2
3	MF	48	(United States) Gavin Turner	2	0	0	2
3	DF	26	(United States) Milo Garvanian	1	1	0	2
7	MF	11	(South Korea) Min-jae Kwak	1	0	0	1
7	MF	33	(England) Alex McGrath	1	0	0	1
7	FW	58	(United States) Jesus Ibarra	1	0	0	1
7	FW	10	(Norway) Markus Naglestad	0	1	0	1
Total				26	1	0	27

- Last updated: October 5, 2025
- Source: https://www.mlsnextpro.com/clubs/chattanooga-fc/stats/#season=MLS-SEA-0001K9&competition=mls-next-pro&club=MLS-CLU-00003H&statType=general&position=all

==== Disciplinary record ====
No.	Pos.	Player	MLS Next Pro			U.S. Open Cup			MLSNP Playoffs			Total		
No.	Pos.	Player	Booked	(yellow card) (yellow-red card)	Sent off (straight red)	Booked	(yellow card) (yellow-red card)	Sent off (straight red)	Booked	(yellow card) (yellow-red card)	Sent off (straight red)	Booked	(yellow card) (yellow-red card)	Sent off (straight red)
1	GK	(Switzerland) Eldin Jakupović	3	0	0	0	0	0	0	0	0	3	0	0
2	DF	(United States) Robert Screen	1	0	0	0	0	0	0	0	0	1	0	0
3	DF	(United States) Tate Robertson	8	0	0	0	0	0	0	0	0	8	0	0
4	DF	(United States) Logan Brown	0	0	0	0	0	0	0	0	0	0	0	0
5	DF	(Argentina) Farid Sar-Sar	6	0	0	1	0	0	1	0	0	8	0	0
7	FW	(Algeria) Ameziane Sid Mohand	1	0	0	0	0	0	0	0	0	1	0	0
8	MF	(England) Callum Watson	8	1	0	2	0	0	0	0	0	10	1	0
9	FW	(Denmark) Peter Plougmand	0	0	0	0	0	0	0	0	0	0	0	0
10	FW	(Norway) Markus Naglestad	0	0	0	0	0	0	0	0	0	0	0	0
11	MF	(South Korea) Min-jae Kwak	1	0	0	1	0	0	0	0	0	2	0	0
14	DF	(United States) Nathan Koehler	5	0	0	0	0	0	0	0	0	5	0	0
15	MF	(Haiti) Steeve Louis Jean	2	0	0	1	0	0	0	0	0	3	0	0
16	MF	(United States) Daniel Mangarov	3	0	0	2	0	0	0	0	0	5	0	0
17	MF	(Honduras) Darwin Ortiz	2	0	0	0	0	0	0	0	0	2	0	0
18	MF	(United States) Luke Husakiwsky	1	0	0	0	0	0	0	0	0	1	0	0
19	MF	(United States) Colin Thomas	0	0	0	0	0	0	0	0	0	0	0	0
20	DF	(United States) Ethan Dudley	0	0	0	0	0	0	0	0	0	0	0	0
22	DF	(United States) Milo Garvanian	4	0	0	1	0	0	0	0	0	5	0	0
25	GK	(United States) J. P. Philpot	0	0	0	0	0	0	0	0	0	0	0	0
26	FW	(United States) Keegan Ancelin	5	0	0	1	0	0	0	0	0	6	0	0
27	MF	(United States) Nick Mendonca	5	0	0	0	0	0	0	0	0	5	0	0
33	MF	(England) Alex McGrath	0	0	0	0	0	0	0	0	0	0	0	0
48	MF	(United States) Gavin Turner	3	0	0	0	0	0	0	0	0	3	0	0
51	GK	(United States) Michael Barrueta	0	0	0	0	0	0	0	0	0	0	0	0
58	FW	(United States) Jesus Ibarra	0	0	0	1	0	0	0	0	0	1	0	0
71	MF	(United States) Jalen James	3	0	0	0	0	0	0	0	0	3	0	0
90	FW	(United States) Yuval Cohen	0	0	0	0	0	0	0	0	0	0	0	0
97	FW	(United States) Anthony Garcia	2	0	0	0	0	0	1	0	0	3	0	0
99	DF	(United States) Mike Bleeker	0	0	0	0	0	0	0	0	0	0	0	0
Total			62	1	0	10	0	0	2	0	0	74	1	0

- Last updated: October 19, 2025
- Source: https://www.mlsnextpro.com/clubs/chattanooga-fc/stats/#season=MLS-SEA-0001K9&competition=mls-next-pro&club=MLS-CLU-00003H&statType=general&position=all

== Awards and honors ==
=== MLS NEXT Pro Goal of the Matchweek ===
Player	Matchweek	Reference
(Haiti) Steeve Louis Jean	12	
(United States) Gavin Turner	18	
(United States) Nathan Koehler	22	
(United States) Luke Husakiwsky	27	

=== MLS NEXT Pro Team of the Month ===
Month	Ref
April	

=== MLS NEXT Pro Goalkeeper of the Month ===
Player	Month	Ref
(Switzerland) Eldin Jakupović	September	

=== MLS NEXT Pro Goalkeeper of the Year ===
Player	Ref
(Switzerland) Eldin Jakupović	

=== MLS NEXT Pro Best XI ===
Player	Position	Ref
(Switzerland) Eldin Jakupović	Goalkeeper	
(United States) Tate Robertson	Defender	
