= 2024 Chattanooga FC season =

American soccer team season

Chattanooga FC
2024 season
- Owner: Thomas Clark; Sheldon Grizzle
- Chairman: David Grizzard
- Head coach: Rod Underwood
- Stadium: Finley Stadium
- MLSNP: Southeast Division: 4th Eastern Conference: 9th MLSNP:14th
- MLSNP Cup Playoffs: Did not Qualify
- 2024 U.S. Open Cup: 1st Round
- Top goalscorer: League: Mehdi Ouamri (12 goals); All: Mehdi Ouamri (12 goals)
- Highest home attendance: 4,741 July 27 vs Orlando City B
- Lowest home attendance: 2,469 June 1 vs New England Revolution II
- Average home league attendance: 3,691
- Biggest win: CFC 6–2 MIA (MLSNP) (4/13); TOR 1–5 CFC (MLSNP) (4/13)
- Biggest defeat: CFC 1–5 MIA (MLSNP) (8/25)
- All statistics correct as of 19:59, May 5, 2024 (UTC).

The 2024 Chattanooga season is the club's sixteenth season. The first eleven seasons Chattanooga FC competed as an amateur team in National Premier Soccer League. Chattanooga FC was a successful amateur team, winning the NPSL season champion eight times and finish second in post-season playoffs four times. In 2015, Chattanooga FC claimed the title of best amateur team in the country by winning the United States Adult Soccer Association Hank Steinbrecher Cup, beating Michigan Bucks 3–0. In 2019, Chattanooga FC became a professional team, joining National Independent Soccer Association. Chattanooga FC success continued in 2023 when the team finished as the NISA season champions and advanced to the post season semi-finals.

== Staff ==
As of January 15, 2024

| Position | Name |
|---|---|
| Chief Executive Officer | (United States) Alton Byrd |
| Head Coach and Sporting Director | (United States) Rod Underwood |

=== Current roster ===
As of March 26, 2024

| No. | Pos. | Nation | Player |
|---|---|---|---|
| 2 | DF | USA | Robert Screen |
| 3 | DF | USA | Joseph Patrick Pérez |
| 5 | DF | MDA | Anatolie Prepeliță |
| 6 | MF | ENG | Callum Watson |
| 7 | MF | USA | Damian Rodriguez |
| 8 | MF | USA | Andrés Jiménez Aranzazu |
| 9 | FW | FRA | Mehdi Ouamri |
| 10 | MF | MEX | Luis Garcia Sosa |
| 11 | FW | USA | Taylor Gray |
| 12 | MF | USA | Ethan Koren |
| 14 | DF | ARG | Farid Sar-Sar |
| 15 | GK | HAI | Jean Antoine |
| 16 | MF | USA | Gavin Castle |
| 17 | MF | USA | Darwin Ortiz |
| 18 | MF | KOR | Min-jae Kwak |
| 19 | FW | COL | Carlos Rivas |
| 20 | DF | COL | Duvan Viafara |
| 22 | DF | USA | Milo Garvanian |
| 23 | DF | TTO | Jesse Williams |
| 24 | DF | USA | Logan Brown |
| 25 | MF | GHA | Jude Arthur |
| 32 | GK | USA | Jon Burke |
| 33 | MF | ENG | Alex McGrath |
| 51 | GK | USA | Michael Barrueta |
| 58 | FW | USA | Jesus Ibarra |
| 71 | MF | USA | Jalen James |
| 99 | FW | NOR | Markus Naglestad |

== Transfers ==
=== In ===
| Date | Position | No. | Name | From | Fee | Ref. |
|---|---|---|---|---|---|---|
| December 15, 2023 | DF | 23 | (Trinidad and Tobago) Jesse Williams | (United States) Central Valley Fuego | Free agent | |
| January 3, 2024 | DF | 22 | (United States) Milo Garvanian | (United States) New Mexico United | Free agent | |
| January 10, 2024 | DF | 2 | (United States) Robert Screen | (United States) Forward Madison | Free agent | |
| January 14, 2024 | DF | | (Colombia) Duvan Viafara | (Venezuela) BDeportivo La Guaira | Free agent | |
| February 23, 2024 | CB | 20 | (United States) Logan Brown | (United States) Dayton Flyers | one-year deal | |

=== Out ===
| Date | Position | No. | Name | To | Type | Fee | Ref. |
|---|---|---|---|---|---|---|---|
| November 10, 2023 | FW | | (United States) Alexi Jaimes | | Released | N/A | |
| November 10, 2023 | FW | | (United States) Lenny Lopez | | Released | N/A | |
| November 10, 2023 | MF | | (Zambia) Mutaya Mwape | | Released | N/A | |
| November 10, 2023 | FW | 99 | (Norway) Markus Naglestad | | Released | N/A | |
| November 10, 2023 | DF | | (South Korea) So Jung-Woo | | Released | N/A | |
| November 10, 2023 | MF | 5 | (United States) Colin Stripling | | Released | N/A | |
| November 10, 2023 | MF | 9 | (United States) Leonel Alvarenga | | Loan expired | N/A | |

== Non-competitive fixtures ==
=== Preseason ===
| February 16 | Chattanooga FC | 1–0 | South Georgia Tormenta FC | Huntsville, Alabama |
| | 87' (pen.) | | | Stadium: Joe W. Davis Stadium |
Note: Huntsville City FC Blastoff Battle

| February 18 | Chattanooga FC | 2–0 | UAH Chargers | Huntsville, Alabama |
| 11:00 AM CT | 6'; 35' | | | Stadium: Joe W. Davis Stadium |
Note: Huntsville City FC Blastoff Battle

| February 24 | Chattanooga FC | 4–0 | UMA FC | Chattanooga, Tennessee |
| 3:00 pm EST | Trialist 2 2'; Sosa 15'; Trialist 1 44'; Trialist 3 84' | Report | | Stadium: Finley Stadium |

| March 2 | Chattanooga FC | 0–3 | Birmingham Legion | Chattanooga, Tennessee |
| 3:00 pm EST | | Report | Preston 18'; Pasher 24' (pen.); Turay 54' | Stadium: Finley Stadium |

== Competitive fixtures ==
=== Standings ===
| Pos | Div | Team | Pld | W | SOW | SOL | L | GF | GA | GD | Pts | Qualification |
|---|---|---|---|---|---|---|---|---|---|---|---|---|
| 7 | NE | Columbus Crew 2 | 28 | 11 | 4 | 4 | 9 | 53 | 47 | +6 | 45 | Qualification for the Playoffs |
| 8 | SE | Crown Legacy FC | 28 | 11 | 5 | 2 | 10 | 51 | 46 | +5 | 45 | Qualification for the Playoffs |
| 9 | SE | Chattanooga FC | 28 | 9 | 8 | 2 | 9 | 45 | 42 | +3 | 45 | |
| 10 | SE | Carolina Core FC | 28 | 12 | 3 | 1 | 12 | 39 | 45 | −6 | 43 | |
| 11 | NE | New York Red Bulls II | 28 | 10 | 4 | 2 | 12 | 56 | 61 | −5 | 40 | |

Source: MLSNP Eastern Conference
Rules for classification: 1) points; 2) total wins; 3) total goal differential; 4) total goals scored; 5) fewer disciplinary points; 6) away goal differential; 7) away goals scored; 8) home goals differential; 9) home goals scored; 10) coin toss (2 clubs tied) or drawing of lots (≥3 clubs tied)

=== League ===
| Matchday | Date | Opponent | Venue | Result (Note: Chattanooga FC's score written first) | Scorers | Attendance | Referee | Position |
|---|---|---|---|---|---|---|---|---|
| 1 | March 16 | Huntsville City FC | Finley Stadium | 2–2 (3–2 p) | Gray 40'; McGrath 84' (pen.) | 4,378 | JC Griggs | 6th Eastern Conf. |
| 2 | March 23 | FC Cincinnati 2 | Finley Stadium | 3–0 | Ibarra 60', 67'; Ouamri 71' | 2,810 | Anya Voigt | 3rd Eastern Conf. |
| 3 | March 27 | New York City FC II | Belson Stadium | 1–1 (2–4 p) | Gray 8' | | Joshua Encarnacion | 3rd Eastern Conf. |
| 4 | April 13 | Inter Miami CF II | Finley Stadium | 6–2 | James 6', 40', 45+3'; McGrath 35', 71'; Koren 90+1' | 3,948 | Elvis Osmanovic | 3rd Eastern Conf. |
| 5 | April 20 | Huntsville City FC | Wicks Family Stadium | 1–0 | McGrath 86' | 4,260 | Luis Diego Arroyo | 2nd Eastern Conf. |
| 6 | April 24 | Atlanta United 2 | Fifth Third Bank Stadium | 0–1 | | | Mario Maric | 3rd Eastern Conf. |
| 7 | April 27 | Carolina Core FC | Finley Stadium | 2–0 | Ibarra 7'; Garvanian 75' | 3,614 | Atahan Yaya | 1st Eastern Conf. |
| 8 | May 4 | Orlando City B | Finley Stadium | 1–1 (5–4 p) | Ouamri 3' | 3,811 | Kyle Johnston | 1st Eastern Conf. |
| 9 | May 10 | Inter Miami CF II | Chase Stadium | 2–1 | Ibarra 13', Ouamri 86' | | Alex Beehler | 1st Eastern Conf. |
| 10 | May 15 | Crown Legacy FC | Sportsplex at Matthews | 1–4 | James 77' | | Arnel Selman | 1st Eastern Conf. |
| 11 | May 25 | Atlanta United 2 | Finley Stadium | 2–2 (5–3 p) | Garvanian 47', Ibarra 87' | 4,115 | Esad Omanovic | 2nd Eastern Conf. |
| 12 | June 1 | New England Revolution II | Finley Stadium | 1–0 | Ouamri 80' | 2,469 | Wes Caouette | 2nd Eastern Conf. |
| 13 | June 7 | Chicago Fire FC II | SeatGeek Stadium | 1–1 (3–4 p) | Ouamri 68' | | Greg Dopka | 2nd Eastern Conf. |
| 14 | June 13 | Orlando City B | Osceola County Stadium | 2–2 (4–2 p) | Ouamri 56', Viafara 90+5' | | Calin Radosav | 2nd Eastern Conf. |
| 15 | June 22 | Carolina Core FC | Finley Stadium | 1–2 | James 76' | 3,867 | Olvin Olvia | 2nd Eastern Conf. |
| 16 | July 6 | Crown Legacy FC | Finley Stadium | 1–2 | Ouamri 70' Pen. | 3,294 | Stearne Briem | 3rd Eastern Conf. |
| 17 | July 11 | Philadelphia Union II | Subaru Park | 1–3 | Viafara 34' | | Ricardo Montero | 4th Eastern Conf. |
| 18 | July 17 | Carolina Core FC | Truist Point | 1–2 | McGrath 88' | 3,152 | Marie Durr | 4th Eastern Conf. |
| 19 | July 27 | Orlando City B | Finley Stadium | 1–0 | McGrath 57' | 4,741 | John Matto | 4th Eastern Conf. |
| 20 | August 3 | Toronto FC II | Finley Stadium | 1–1 (5–3 p) | Ouamri 36' | 3,769 | Russell Miller | 6th Eastern Conf. |
| 21 | August 10 | Huntsville City FC | Wicks Family Stadium | 0–1 | | 4,567 | Johnathan Luk | 6th Eastern Conf. |
| 22 | August 18 | Crown Legacy FC | Sportsplex at Matthews | 1–1 (3–2 p) | Ouamri 88' | | Elvis Osmanovic | 6th Eastern Conf. |
| 23 | August 25 | Inter Miami CF II | Chase Stadium | 1–5 | Ouamri 19' | | Melvin Rivas | 8th Eastern Conf. |
| 24 | September 1 | Atlanta United 2 | Finley Stadium | 3–4 | Garvanian 27', Ouamri 45+1, 62' | 3,554 | William Hale | 9th Eastern Conf. |
| 25 | September 8 | Columbus Crew 2 | Finley Stadium | 2–1 | Ibarra 41', Garvanian 67' | 3,127 | Jordan Gray | 9th Eastern Conf. |
| 26 | September 21 | New England Revolution II | Gillette Stadium | 1–1 (5–4 p) | Kwak 18' | | Melinda Homa | 9th Eastern Conf. |
| 27 | September 29 | Toronto FC II | York Lions Stadium | 5–1 | Ibarra 35', Garvanian 62', Gray 66' 80', McGrath 70' | | Fabrizio Stasolla | 9th Eastern Conf. |
| 28 | October 6 | New York Red Bulls II | Finley Stadium | 1–1 (7–6 p) | Watson 6' | 4,178 | Adam Kilpatrick | 9th Eastern Conf. |

=== U.S. Open Cup ===
| Matchday | Date | Opponent | Venue | Result (Note: Chattanooga FC's score written first) | Scorers | Attendance | Referee |
|---|---|---|---|---|---|---|---|
| First Round | March 19 | (Florida) Miami United FC (USSL) | Finley Stadium | 0–1 | | 2,312 | Geoff Cameron |

=== Statistics ===
Numbers after plus-sign(+) denote appearances as a substitute.

==== Appearances and goals ====
| No. | Pos | Nat | Player | Total | | MLS Next Pro | | U.S. Open Cup | | MLSNP Playoffs | |
| No. | Pos | Nat | Player | Apps | Goals | Apps | Goals | Apps | Goals | Apps | Goals |
|---|---|---|---|---|---|---|---|---|---|---|---|
| 2 | DF | (United States) USA | Robert Screen | 4 | 0 | 0+3 | 0 | 1+0 | 0 | 0+0 | 0 |
| 3 | DF | (United States) USA | Joseph Patrick Pérez | 26 | 0 | 15+10 | 0 | 1+0 | 0 | 0+0 | 0 |
| 5 | DF | (Moldova) MDA | Anatolie Prepeliță | 23 | 0 | 20+2 | 0 | 1+0 | 0 | 0+0 | 0 |
| 6 | MF | (England) ENG | Callum Watson | 18 | 1 | 8+9 | 1 | 1+0 | 0 | 0+0 | 0 |
| 7 | MF | (United States) USA | Damian Rodriguez | 0 | 0 | 0+0 | 0 | 0+0 | 0 | 0+0 | 0 |
| 8 | MF | (United States) USA | Andrés Jiménez Aranzazu | 29 | 0 | 25+3 | 0 | 1+0 | 0 | 0+0 | 0 |
| 9 | FW | (France) FRA | Mehdi Ouamri | 28 | 12 | 25+2 | 12 | 0+1 | 0 | 0+0 | 0 |
| 10 | MF | (Mexico) MEX | Luis Garcia Sosa | 21 | 0 | 12+8 | 0 | 0+1 | 0 | 0+0 | 0 |
| 11 | FW | (United States) USA | Taylor Gray | 28 | 4 | 25+2 | 4 | 1+0 | 0 | 0+0 | 0 |
| 12 | MF | (United States) USA | Ethan Koren | 8 | 1 | 1+6 | 1 | 1+0 | 0 | 0+0 | 0 |
| 14 | DF | (Argentina) ARG | Farid Sar-Sar | 24 | 0 | 16+7 | 0 | 1+0 | 0 | 0+0 | 0 |
| 15 | GK | (Haiti) HAI | Jean Antoine | 19 | 0 | 19+0 | 0 | 0+0 | 0 | 0+0 | 0 |
| 16 | MF | (United States) USA | Gavin Castle | 0 | 0 | 0+0 | 0 | 0+0 | 0 | 0+0 | 0 |
| 17 | MF | (United States) USA | Darwin Ortiz | 0 | 0 | 0+0 | 0 | 0+0 | 0 | 0+0 | 0 |
| 18 | MF | (South Korea) KOR | Min-jae Kwak | 15 | 1 | 9+6 | 1 | 0+0 | 0 | 0+0 | 0 |
| 19 | FW | (Colombia) COL | Carlos Rivas | 10 | 0 | 1+9 | 0 | 0+0 | 0 | 0+0 | 0 |
| 20 | DF | (Colombia) COL | Duvan Viafara | 24 | 2 | 23+1 | 2 | 0+0 | 0 | 0+0 | 0 |
| 22 | DF | (United States) USA | Milo Garvanian | 28 | 5 | 25+2 | 5 | 1+0 | 0 | 0+0 | 0 |
| 23 | DF | (Trinidad and Tobago) TTO | Jesse Williams | 16 | 0 | 12+4 | 0 | 0+0 | 0 | 0+0 | 0 |
| 24 | DF | (United States) USA | Logan Brown | 5 | 0 | 4+1 | 0 | 0+0 | 0 | 0+0 | 0 |
| 25 | MF | (Ghana) GHA | Jude Arthur | 19 | 0 | 17+2 | 0 | 0+0 | 0 | 0+0 | 0 |
| 32 | GK | (United States) USA | Jon Burke | 12 | 0 | 9+2 | 0 | 1+0 | 0 | 0+0 | 0 |
| 33 | MF | (England) ENG | Alex McGrath | 28 | 7 | 24+3 | 7 | 1+0 | 0 | 0+0 | 0 |
| 51 | GK | (United States) USA | Michael Barrueta | 0 | 0 | 0+0 | 0 | 0+0 | 0 | 0+0 | 0 |
| 58 | FW | (United States) USA | Jesus Ibarra | 18 | 7 | 13+4 | 7 | 0+1 | 0 | 0+0 | 0 |
| 71 | MF | (United States) USA | Jalen James | 23 | 5 | 6+16 | 5 | 0+1 | 0 | 0+0 | 0 |
| 99 | FW | (Norway) NOR | Markus Naglestad | 6 | 0 | 0+6 | 0 | 0+0 | 0 | 0+0 | 0 |

- Last updated: October 6, 2024
- Source: https://www.mlsnextpro.com/clubs/chattanooga-fc/stats/#season=2024&competition=mls-next-pro&club=11662&statType=general&position=all

==== Top scorers ====
| Rank | Position | Number | Name | MLS Next Pro | U.S. Open Cup | MLSNP Playoffs | Total |
|---|---|---|---|---|---|---|---|
| 1 | FW | 9 | (France) Mehdi Ouamri | 12 | 0 | 0 | 12 |
| 2 | FW | 58 | (United States) Jesus Ibarra | 7 | 0 | 0 | 7 |
| 2 | MF | 33 | (England) Alex McGrath | 7 | 0 | 0 | 7 |
| 4 | DF | 22 | (United States) Milo Garvanian | 6 | 0 | 0 | 6 |
| 5 | MF | 71 | (United States) Jalen James | 5 | 0 | 0 | 5 |
| 6 | FW | 11 | (United States) Taylor Gray | 4 | 0 | 0 | 4 |
| 7 | DF | 20 | (Colombia) Duvan Viafara | 2 | 0 | 0 | 2 |
| 8 | MF | 6 | (England) Callum Watson | 1 | 0 | 0 | 1 |
| 8 | MF | 12 | (United States) Ethan Koren | 1 | 0 | 0 | 1 |
| 8 | MF | 18 | (South Korea) Min-jae Kwak | 1 | 0 | 0 | 1 |
| Total | | | | 45 | 0 | 0 | 45 |

- Last updated: October 6, 2024
- Source: https://www.mlsnextpro.com/clubs/chattanooga-fc/stats/#season=2024&competition=mls-next-pro&club=11662&statType=general&position=all

==== Top assists ====
| Rank | Position | Number | Name | MLS Next Pro | U.S. Open Cup | MLSNP Playoffs | Total |
|---|---|---|---|---|---|---|---|
| 1 | FW | 11 | (United States) Taylor Gray | 8 | 0 | 0 | 8 |
| 2 | DF | 20 | (United States) Milo Garvanian | 7 | 0 | 0 | 7 |
| 3 | MF | 33 | (England) Alex McGrath | 5 | 0 | 0 | 5 |
| 4 | FW | 9 | (France) Mehdi Ouamri | 3 | 0 | 0 | 3 |
| 4 | FW | 58 | (United States) Jesus Ibarra | 3 | 0 | 0 | 3 |
| 6 | MF | 6 | (England) Callum Watson | 2 | 0 | 0 | 2 |
| 6 | MF | 10 | (Mexico) Luis Garcia Sosa | 2 | 0 | 0 | 2 |
| 6 | MF | 25 | (Ghana) Jude Arthur | 2 | 0 | 0 | 2 |
| 9 | DF | 3 | (United States) Joseph Patrick Pérez | 1 | 0 | 0 | 1 |
| 9 | DF | 5 | (Moldova) Anatolie Prepeliță | 1 | 0 | 0 | 1 |
| 9 | MF | 8 | (United States) Andrés Jiménez Aranzazu | 1 | 0 | 0 | 1 |
| 9 | FW | 19 | (Colombia) Carlos Rivas | 1 | 0 | 0 | 1 |
| 9 | DF | 24 | (United States) Logan Brown | 1 | 0 | 0 | 1 |
| 9 | MF | 71 | (United States) Jalen James | 1 | 0 | 0 | 1 |
| 9 | FW | 99 | (Norway) Markus Naglestad | 1 | 0 | 0 | 1 |
| Total | | | | 40 | 0 | 0 | 40 |

- Last updated: October 6, 2024
- Source: https://www.mlsnextpro.com/clubs/chattanooga-fc/stats/#season=2024&competition=mls-next-pro&club=11662&statType=general&position=all

==== Disciplinary record ====
| No. | Pos. | Player | MLS Next Pro | | | U.S. Open Cup | | | MLSNP Playoffs | | | Total | | |
| No. | Pos. | Player | Booked | (yellow card) (yellow-red card) | Sent off (straight red) | Booked | (yellow card) (yellow-red card) | Sent off (straight red) | Booked | (yellow card) (yellow-red card) | Sent off (straight red) | Booked | (yellow card) (yellow-red card) | Sent off (straight red) |
|---|---|---|---|---|---|---|---|---|---|---|---|---|---|---|
| 2 | DF | (United States) Robert Screen | 0 | 0 | 0 | 0 | 0 | 0 | 0 | 0 | 0 | 0 | 0 | 0 |
| 3 | DF | (United States) Joseph Perez | 4 | 0 | 0 | 0 | 0 | 0 | 0 | 0 | 0 | 4 | 0 | 0 |
| 5 | DF | (Moldova) Anatolie Prepeliță | 8 | 1 | 0 | 1 | 0 | 0 | 0 | 0 | 0 | 9 | 1 | 0 |
| 6 | MF | (England) Callum Watson | 6 | 0 | 0 | 0 | 0 | 0 | 0 | 0 | 0 | 6 | 0 | 0 |
| 7 | MF | (United States) Damian Rodriguez | 0 | 0 | 0 | 0 | 0 | 0 | 0 | 0 | 0 | 0 | 0 | 0 |
| 8 | MF | (United States) Andrés Jiménez Aranzazu | 7 | 0 | 0 | 0 | 0 | 0 | 0 | 0 | 0 | 7 | 0 | 0 |
| 9 | FW | (France) Mehdi Ouamri | 4 | 1 | 0 | 0 | 0 | 0 | 0 | 0 | 0 | 4 | 1 | 0 |
| 10 | MF | (Mexico) Luis Garcia Sosa | 2 | 0 | 0 | 0 | 0 | 0 | 0 | 0 | 0 | 2 | 0 | 0 |
| 11 | FW | (United States) Taylor Gray | 6 | 0 | 0 | 0 | 0 | 0 | 0 | 0 | 0 | 6 | 0 | 0 |
| 12 | MF | (United States) Ethan Koren | 0 | 0 | 0 | 0 | 0 | 0 | 0 | 0 | 0 | 0 | 0 | 0 |
| 14 | DF | (Argentina) Farid Sar-Sar | 4 | 0 | 0 | 0 | 0 | 0 | 0 | 0 | 0 | 4 | 0 | 0 |
| 15 | GK | (Haiti) Jean Antoine | 0 | 0 | 1 | 0 | 0 | 0 | 0 | 0 | 0 | 0 | 0 | 1 |
| 16 | MF | (United States) Gavin Castle | 0 | 0 | 0 | 0 | 0 | 0 | 0 | 0 | 0 | 0 | 0 | 0 |
| 17 | MF | (United States) Darwin Ortiz | 0 | 0 | 0 | 0 | 0 | 0 | 0 | 0 | 0 | 0 | 0 | 0 |
| 18 | MF | (South Korea) Min-jae Kwak | 3 | 0 | 0 | 0 | 0 | 0 | 0 | 0 | 0 | 3 | 0 | 0 |
| 19 | FW | (Colombia) Carlos Rivas | 3 | 0 | 0 | 0 | 0 | 0 | 0 | 0 | 0 | 3 | 0 | 0 |
| 20 | DF | (Colombia) Duvan Viafara | 3 | 0 | 0 | 0 | 0 | 0 | 0 | 0 | 0 | 3 | 0 | 0 |
| 22 | DF | (United States) Milo Garvanian | 8 | 0 | 0 | 0 | 0 | 0 | 0 | 0 | 0 | 8 | 0 | 0 |
| 23 | DF | (Trinidad and Tobago) Jesse Williams | 2 | 0 | 1 | 0 | 0 | 0 | 0 | 0 | 0 | 2 | 0 | 1 |
| 24 | DF | (United States) Logan Brown | 0 | 0 | 0 | 0 | 0 | 0 | 0 | 0 | 0 | 0 | 0 | 0 |
| 25 | MF | (Ghana) Jude Arthur | 7 | 0 | 0 | 0 | 0 | 0 | 0 | 0 | 0 | 7 | 0 | 0 |
| 32 | GK | (United States) Jon Burke | 0 | 0 | 0 | 0 | 0 | 0 | 0 | 0 | 0 | 0 | 0 | 0 |
| 33 | MF | (England) Alex McGrath | 7 | 0 | 0 | 0 | 0 | 0 | 0 | 0 | 0 | 7 | 0 | 0 |
| 51 | GK | (United States) Michael Barrueta | 0 | 0 | 0 | 0 | 0 | 0 | 0 | 0 | 0 | 0 | 0 | 0 |
| 58 | FW | (United States) Jesus Ibarra | 2 | 0 | 0 | 0 | 0 | 0 | 0 | 0 | 0 | 2 | 0 | 0 |
| 71 | MF | (United States) Jalen James | 0 | 0 | 0 | 0 | 0 | 0 | 0 | 0 | 0 | 0 | 0 | 0 |
| 99 | FW | (Norway) Markus Naglestad | 0 | 0 | 0 | 0 | 0 | 0 | 0 | 0 | 0 | 0 | 0 | 0 |
| Total | | | 76 | 2 | 2 | 1 | 0 | 0 | 0 | 0 | 0 | 77 | 2 | 2 |

- Last updated: October 6, 2024
- Source: https://www.mlsnextpro.com/clubs/chattanooga-fc/stats/#season=2024&competition=mls-next-pro&club=11662&statType=general&position=all

== Awards and honors ==
=== MLS NEXT Pro Goal of the Week ===
| Week | Player | Ref |
|---|---|---|
| 2 | (United States) Jesus Ibarra | |
| 12 | (France) Mehdi Ouamri | |
| 28 | (South Korea) Min-jae Kwak | |

=== MLS NEXT Pro Team of the Matchweek ===
| MatchWeek | Ref |
|---|---|
| 5 | |
| 26 | |
| 29 | |

=== MLS NEXT Pro Team of the Month ===
| Month | Ref |
|---|---|
| April | |

=== MLS NEXT Pro Best XI ===
| Player | Position | Ref |
|---|---|---|
| (France) Mehdi Ouamri | Forward | |
