= 2026 Chattanooga FC season =

Chattanooga FC
2026 season
- Owner: Thomas Clark; Sheldon Grizzle
- Chairman: David Grizzard
- Head coach: Richard Dixon
- Stadium: Finley Stadium
- MLSNP: Southeast Division:2nd; Eastern Conference:2nd; MLSNP:4th
- MLSNP Cup Playoffs: Champions
- 2026 U.S. Open Cup: Round of 32
- Top goalscorer: League: Alex Krehl (18 Goals); All: Alex Krehl (20 Goals)
- Highest home attendance: 10,228, vs Los Angeles FC 2 November 8
- Lowest home attendance: 2,237, March 8 vs CT United FC, March 18 2,139 vs Kalonji Pro-Profile US Open Cup
- Average home league attendance: 3,209 (1 missing), 3,250 with US Open Cup, 3,591 With US Open Cup and Playoffs, With Playoffs but not US Open Cup 3,619 (1 Missing)
- Biggest win: Chattanooga FC 4–2 New York Red Bulls II June 6
- Biggest defeat: Chattanooga FC 1–4 Crown Legacy FC March 1
- All statistics correct as of 19:59, March 28, 2026 (UTC).

The 2026 Chattanooga season is the club's eighteenth season. It is the third season in MLS Next Pro and the third with independent teams with the Carolina Core and Connecticut United FC. The first eleven seasons Chattanooga FC competed as an amateur team in National Premier Soccer League. Chattanooga FC was a successful amateur team, winning the NPSL season champion eight times and finish second in post-season playoffs four times. Last season Chattanooga FC made the playoffs for the first time in MLS Next Pro but lost in the first round to Huntsville City FC 2–0.

== Technical staff ==
Technical staff
Head coach Interim	(Jamaica) Richard Dixon
Assistant coach	(England) Adam Reekie
Director of Goalkeeping Assistant Coach	(Colombia) Juan Carlos "JC" Garzon
Director of soccer operations	(United States) Jordan Mattheiss

=== Current roster ===
As of July 15, 2026

No.	Pos.	Nation	Player
1	GK	SUI	Eldin Jakupović
2	DF	CAN	Yves Tcheuyap
3	DF	USA	Tate Robertson
4	DF	USA	Mattias Hanchard
5	DF	ARG	Farid Sar-Sar
6	MF	HAI	Steeve Louis-Jean
7	FW	USA	Anthony García
9	MF	GRN	Damien Barker John
10	MF	USA	Daniel Mangarov
11	MF	ALG	Ameziane Sid Mohand
13	DF	USA	Anthony Sorenson
14	DF	USA	Nathan Koehler
17	MF	HON	Darwin Ortiz
18	MF	USA	Luke Husakiwsky
19	FW	JAM	Ashton Gordon (on loan from Atlanta United)
20	MF	GHA	Kenneth Tsokli
21	MF	GHA	Francis Amoateng
23	FW	USA	Alex Krehl
29	FW	ARG	Alexis Arrúa
33	MF	ENG	Alex McGrath
38	DF	ARG	Junior Flores
47	MF	SLE	Isaiah Jones (on loan from Nashville SC)
51	GK	USA	Michael Barrueta
77	GK	USA	Griffin Huff
90	FW	USA	Yuval Cohen

Chattanooga FC Academy player.

== Transfers ==
=== In ===
Date	Position	No.	Name	From	Type	Fee	Ref.
November 17, 2025	DF	13	(United States) Anthony Sorenson	(United States) Charlotte Independence	One-year Deal	NA	
November 24, 2025	GK	77	(United States) Griffin Huff	(United States) Lexington SC	One-year Deal	NA	
December 1, 2025	DF	2	(Canada) Yves Tcheuyap	(United States) Crown Legacy FC	One-year Deal	NA	
January 6, 2026	MF	9	(Grenada) Damian Barker John	(United States) Huntsville City FC	One-year Deal	NA	
January 8, 2026	FW	29	(Argentina) Alexis Arrúa	(Argentina) Racing Club	One-year Deal	NA	
January 12, 2026	DF	38	(Argentina) Junior Flores	(Argentina) Club Atlético Colón	Two-year Deal	NA	
January 13, 2026	MF	20	(Ghana) Kenneth Tsokli	(Ghana) Right to Dream Academy	One-year Deal	NA	
January 14, 2026	MF	21	(Ghana) Francis Amoateng	(Ghana) Right to Dream Academy	One-year Deal	NA	
January 20, 2026	DF	4	(United States) Mattias Hanchard	(Germany) Rot Weiss Ahlen	One-year Deal	NA	
February 24, 2026	FW	23	(United States) Alex Krehl	(Spain) CD Lealtad	One-year Deal	NA	

=== Loan In ===
No.	Pos.	Player	Loaned from	Start	End	Source
19	FW	(Jamaica) Ashton Gordon	(United States) Atlanta United	January 7, 2026	December 31, 2026	
47	MF	(Sierra Leone) Isaiah Jones	(United States) Nashville SC	January 9, 2026	December 31, 2026	

=== Loan Out ===
No.	Pos.	Player	Loaned from	Start	End	Source
26	FW	(United States) Keegan Ancelin	(Republic of Ireland) Drogheda United	July 15, 2026	December 31, 2026	

=== Out ===
Date	Position	No.	Name	To	Type	Fee	Ref.
October 27, 2025	GK	25	(United States) J.P. Philpot		Option Declined	N/A	
October 27, 2025	FW	11	(South Korea) Minjae Kwak		Option Declined	N/A	
October 27, 2025	DF	4	(United States) Logan Brown	NA	Released	N/A	
October 27, 2025	MF	27	(United States) Nick Mendonca	(United States) New York Cosmos	Option Declined	N/A	
October 27, 2025	DF	20	(United States) Ethan Dudley	(United States) Sporting JAX	Released	N/A	
October 27, 2025	DF	2	(United States) Robert Screen		Released	N/A	
October 27, 2025	MF	8	(England) Callum Watson	NA	Released	N/A	
October 27, 2025	FW	10	(Norway) Markus Naglestad		Released	N/A	
October 27, 2025	FW	10	(United States) Gavin Turner	(United States) DC United	Loan Expired	N/A	

== Non-competitive fixtures ==
=== Preseason ===
January 25	Chattanooga FC	P–P	Tecce FC	Chattanooga, Tennessee
2:00 PM EDT				Stadium: Finley Stadium; Attendance: Closed to the public

February 7	Chattanooga FC	2–3	Birmingham Legion FC	Chattanooga, Tennessee
3:00 PM EDT	Garcia 39'; Mangarov 51'		Damus 19'; 59'; 90'	Stadium: Finley Stadium

February 14	Chattanooga FC	0–0 (4–2 p)	One Knoxville SC	Chattanooga, Tennessee
3:00 PM EDT		Report		Stadium: Finley Stadium; Attendance: 2,456

February 21	Chattanooga FC	4–1	Tecce FC	Chattanooga, Tennessee
2:00 PM EDT	Mangarov 17', 45+1'; Sid Mohand 53'; Jones 89'	Report	13'	Stadium: Finley Stadium; Attendance: Closed to the public

February 21	Chattanooga FC	2–2 (3–4 p)	Georgia Southern Eagles	Chattanooga, Tennessee
3:00 PM EDT	Barker John 4'; Koehler 90+1'	Report	16'; 80'	Stadium: Finley Stadium; Attendance: Closed to the public
	Penalties
	Husakiwsky (penalty missed); Sorenson (penalty scored); Barker John (penalty scored); Gordon (penalty missed); Sar-Sar (penalty scored)		Penalty scored Penalty missed

== Competetive Fixtures ==
=== League ===
==== Match results ====
March 1 1	Chattanooga FC	1–4	Crown Legacy FC	Chattanooga, Tennessee
3:00 PM EDT	Barker John 1'; Sar-Sar (yellow card) 40'; Robertson (yellow card) 63'	Report	Uchegbu 16'; Sangoquiza (yellow card) 37'; Aloko 45+1', 89'; Berchimas 53'; Kamden (yellow card) 90+2'	Stadium: Finley Stadium; Attendance: 3,126; Referee: Alejo Calume

March 8 2	Chattanooga FC	4–2	CT United FC	Chattanooga, Tennessee
3:00 PM EDT	Robertson 23'; McGrath 37'; Krehl 41', 57'; Mangarov (yellow card) 90+3'	Report	Kasule 21'; Rodriguez (yellow card) 32'; Mora (yellow card) 54'; Kamrath (yellow card) 60'; Lacy 74'; van Hees (yellow card) 88'	Stadium: Finley Stadium; Attendance: 2,237; Referee: Stefan Perri

March 15 3	Chicago Fire FC II	2–1	Chattanooga FC	Bridgeview, Illinois
4:00 PM EDT	Shokalook 10'; Poreba 61'; Nigg (yellow card) 73'; Turndean (yellow card) 89'	Report	Koehler (yellow card) 16'; Sorenson (yellow card) 27'; McGrath 50'; Jones (yellow card) 78'	Stadium: SeatGeek Stadium; Referee: Atahan Yaya

March 21 4	Huntsville City FC	2–2 (4–2 p)	Chattanooga FC	Huntsville, Alabama
8:00 PM EDT	Mohammed 15'; Ekk 37'	Report 1 Report 2	Sar-Sar (yellow card) 43'; Krehl 45+1'; Robertson 77' (pen.); Jones (yellow card) 90+3'	Stadium: Wicks Family Field at Joe Davis Stadium; Attendance: 3,654; Referee: Braeden Frey
	Penalties
	Brunet (penalty scored); Coulibaly (penalty scored); Sullivan (penalty scored); Mohammed (penalty scored)		(penalty missed) Robertson; (penalty scored) Mangarov; (penalty scored) Jones; (penalty missed) McGrath

March 28 5	Chattanooga FC	2–0	Columbus Crew 2	Chattanooga, Tennessee
7:00 PM EDT	Tcheuyap (yellow card) 43' (yellow-red card) 84'; Jones (yellow card) 76'; Ancelin 87'; McGrath (yellow card) 90+2' (goal) 90+5'	Report	Pruter (red card) 2'; Nyeman (yellow card) 39'	Stadium: Finley Stadium; Attendance: 3,069; Referee: Erick Lezama Pavon

April 11 6	Chattanooga FC	3–1	Orlando City B	Chattanooga, Tennessee
7:00 PM EDT	McGrath 30'; Mangarov (yellow card) 37'; Barker John 54' (pen.), 67'; Jones (yellow card) 82'	Report	Okonski (yellow card) 26'; Haruna (yellow card) 30'; Sarajian (yellow card) 35' (goal) 83'	Stadium: Finley Stadium; Attendance: 3,256; Referee: Deny Kulasinac

April 18 7	Crown Legacy FC	1–0	Chattanooga FC	Matthews, North Carolina
7:00 PM EDT	Coulibaly (yellow card) 51'; Mbongue 73' (pen.); Smalls (yellow card) 86'	Report	Sorenson (yellow card) 62' (yellow-red card) 72'; Louis-Jean (yellow card) 84'	Stadium: Sportsplex at Matthews; Referee: Amin Hadzic

May 2 8	Chattanooga FC	0–2	Huntsville City FC	Chattanooga, Tennessee
7:00 PM EDT	Koehler (yellow card) 67'	Report	Yoshizawa 47'; Prince (yellow card) 56'; Pariano (yellow card) 87'; Reynolds (yellow card) 90'; Molina 90+4'; Mackay (yellow card) 90+7'; Van Deventer (yellow card) 90+7'	Stadium: Finley Stadium; Attendance: 3,224; Referee: Stephen Foster

May 8 9	Inter Miami CF II	1–2	Chattanooga FC	Fort Lauderdale, Florida
7:00 PM EDT	Zeltzer-Zubida 21'; Abadia-Reda (yellow card) 51'; Marin (yellow card) 89'	Report	Jones (yellow card) 31'; Robertson 80' (pen.); Sar-Sar 90+4' (pen.)	Stadium: Inter Miami CF Stadium; Referee: Mario Maric

May 17 10	FC Cincinnati 2	1–3	Chattanooga FC	Highland Heights, Kentucky
6:00 PM EDT	Kuisel (yellow card) 25'; Chávez (yellow card) 45'; Samson 64'	Report	Krehl 5' (yellow card) 70'; Barker John 20'; Robertson 42'; Husakiwsky (yellow card) 44'; Sorenson (yellow card) 90+4'	Stadium: NKU Soccer Stadium; Referee: Ryan Farrell

May 24 11	Chattanooga FC	1–0	Carolina Core FC	Chattanooga, Tennessee
3:00 PM EDT	Hanchard (yellow card) 16'; Krehl 59'; Sar-Sar (yellow card) 75'	Report	Montenegro (yellow card) 37'	Stadium: Finley Stadium; Referee: Kaitlyn Trowbridge

May 31 12	Orlando City B	5–2	Chattanooga FC	Kissimmee, Florida
7:00 PM EDT	Gómez 6' (yellow card) 26'; Leão 48', 81' (pen.) (yellow card) 88'; Sarajian 50'; Hylton 61'; Rhein (yellow card) 67'; Chikamso (yellow card) 83'	Report	Krehl 28' (yellow card) 46'; Husakiwsky 38'	Stadium: Osceola Heritage Park; Referee: Erick Lezama Pavon

June 6 13	Chattanooga FC	4–0	New York Red Bulls II	Chattanooga, Tennessee
7:00 PM EDT	Robertson 7', 12' (pen.); Jones 57'; Krehl 59'	Report	Nelich (yellow card) 40'; Sánchez (yellow card) 64'	Stadium: Finley Stadium; Attendance: 3,315; Referee: Joe Surgan

June 13 14	Atlanta United 2	4–4 (5–6 p)	Chattanooga FC	Athens, Georgia
7:00 PM EDT	Cisset (yellow card) 40'; Hanchard 57' (o.g.); Sar-Sar 68' (o.g.); Jardines 71' (yellow card) 90+4'; Senanou 79'; Majub (yellow card) 79'; Donaldson (yellow card); Suarez-Couri (yellow card)	Report	Krehl 40', 45+1'; Robertson 48'; Sar-Sar (yellow card) 81'; Cohen 90+5'	Stadium: Turner Soccer Complex; Referee: Kyle Johnston
	Penalties
	Chong Qui (penalty scored); Jardines (penalty scored); Dovlo (penalty scored); Majub (penalty scored); Suarez-Couri (penalty scored); Ettinger (penalty missed)		(penalty scored) Mangarov; (penalty scored) Arrúa; (penalty scored) Cohen; (penalty scored) Garcia; (penalty scored) Sar-Sar; (penalty scored) Sorenson

June 21 15	NYCFC II	1–1 (4–5 p)	Chattanooga FC	Queens, New York City, New York
5:00 PM EDT	Flax 44' (pen.)	Report	Barker John 26'	Stadium: Belson Stadium; Referee: Pavel Georgiev
	Penalties
	Flax (penalty scored); Ponce (penalty scored); Loiola (penalty missed); Suchecki (penalty scored); Lopez (penalty scored); Duque (penalty missed)		(penalty scored) Robertson; (penalty scored) Garcia; (penalty missed) Cohen; (penalty scored) Husakiwsky; (penalty scored) Sar-Sar; (penalty scored) Ancelin

June 27 16	Chattanooga FC	2–2 (4–1 p)	Chicago Fire FC II	Chattanooga, Tennessee
7:00 PM EDT	Husakiwsky (yellow card) 12'; McGrath 45+2'; Barker John 74'	Report	Villanueva 48', 57'	Stadium: Finley Stadium; Attendance: 2,699; Referee: Amin Hadzic
	Penalties
	Robertson (penalty scored); Sid Mohand (penalty scored); Cohen (penalty scored); Mangarov (penalty scored)		(penalty missed) Fleming; (penalty scored) Boltz; (penalty missed) Nigg

July 4 17	Chattanooga FC	1–0	Inter Miami CF II	Chattanooga, Tennessee
7:30 PM EDT	Tcheuyap (yellow card) 48'; Krehl 71'	Report	DePaula (yellow card) 10'; Cadet (yellow card) 67'	Stadium: Erlanger Park; Attendance: 6,107; Referee: Lauren Aldrich

July 12 18	Carolina Core FC	1–1 (2–4 p)	Chattanooga FC	High Point, North Carolina
5:00 PM EDT	Montenegro (yellow card) 27'; Tattevin 61' (pen.); Lundeen (yellow card) 90+4'	Report	Krehl 45'; Louis-Jean (yellow card) 45+5'	Stadium: Truist Point; Referee: Calin Radosav
	Penalties
	Lundeen (penalty missed); Raimbault (penalty scored); Baer (penalty scored); Caiza (penalty missed)		(penalty scored) Robertson; (penalty scored) Cohen; (penalty scored) Garcia; (penalty scored) Husakiwsky

July 18 19	Chattanooga FC	1–1 (3–4 p)	Orlando City B	Chattanooga, Tennessee
7:00 PM EDT	Louis-Jean 75'	Report	Leão 29'	Stadium: Finley Stadium; Attendance: 2,313; Referee: Shaye Lane
	Penalties
	Robertson (penalty missed); Arrúa (penalty scored); Cohen (penalty scored); Husakiwsky (penalty scored); Sar-Sar (penalty missed)		(penalty missed) Hylton; (penalty scored) Amoo-Mensah; (penalty scored) Reid-Brown; (penalty scored) Kendall; (penalty scored) Trombino

July 25 20	Chattanooga FC	4–0	Philadelphia Union II	Chattanooga, Tennessee
7:00 PM EDT	Sid Mohand 12'; Sorenson (yellow card) 34'; Koehler 37'; Barker John 47'; Tcheuyap (yellow card) 66'; Mangarov 75'	Report	Ferreira (yellow card) 11'; Sequera (yellow card) 44'; Cobo (yellow card) 90+1'	Stadium: Finley Stadium; Attendance: 2,640; Referee: Igor Bych

July 31 21	Inter Miami CF II	0–1	Chattanooga FC	Fort Lauderdale, Florida
7:00 PM EDT	Dearmin (yellow card) 83'; Convers (yellow card) 88'	Report	Hanchard (yellow card) 23'; Krehl 32'; Arrúa (yellow card) 71'; Sar-Sar (yellow card) 86'	Stadium: Chase Stadium; Referee: Daniel Emeri

August 8 22	Chattanooga FC	1–0	Atlanta United 2	Chattanooga, Tennessee
7:00 PM ET	Krehl 7'; Mangarov (yellow card) 66'; Sar-Sar (yellow card) 76'; Sid Mohand (yellow card) 89'; McGrath (yellow card) 90+5'	Report		Stadium: Finley Stadium; Attendance: 3,576; Referee: Laith Dahhan

August 14 23	Toronto FC II	2–2 (4–5 p)	Chattanooga FC	North York, Toronto, Ontario
7:00 PM EDT	Nolan 11'; Dawson (yellow card) 74'; Chukwu (yellow card) 86'; Dixon 90+4'	Report	Krehl 24'; McGrath (yellow card) 75'; Sar-Sar 82'; Anthony Garcia (yellow card) 86'; Sid Mohand (yellow card) 90+3'	Stadium: York Lions Stadium; Referee: Thomas Noel
	Penalties
	Nolan (penalty scored); Dixon (penalty scored); Dawson (penalty scored); Costabile (penalty scored); Stojadinovic (penalty scored)		(penalty scored) Anthony Garcia; (penalty scored) Sid Mohand; (penalty missed) Cohen; (penalty scored) Husakiwsky; (penalty scored) Sar-Sar

August 23 24	Crown Legacy FC	3–1	Chattanooga FC	Matthews, North Carolina
7:00 PM EDT	Sangoquiza (yellow card) 11'; Subotić 26'; Smalls (yellow card) 37'; Mbongue 50', 83' (yellow card) 64'; Thomas (yellow card) 72'	Report	Barker John (yellow card) 36'; Robertson (yellow card) 56'; Sorenson (yellow card) 62'; Mangarov 63'	Stadium: Sportsplex at Matthews; Referee: Shaye Lane

August 29 25	Chattanooga FC	5–2	Carolina Core FC	Chattanooga, Tennessee
7:00 PM EDT	Krehl 11', 47', 62' (yellow card) 63'; Jones 51'; Tcheuyap (yellow card) 61'; Robertson 68'	Report	Czech (yellow card) 16'; Martinez (yellow card) 65'; Orbaugh 74'; Diaz 82'; Lundeen (yellow card) 90+2'	Stadium: Finley Stadium; Attendance: 3,047; Referee: Braeden Frey

September 9 26	Huntsville City FC	1–2	Chattanooga FC	Huntsville, Alabama
8:00 PM EDT	Yáñez 29' (pen.) (yellow card) 44'; Knight (yellow card) 40'; Williams (yellow card) 53'	Report	Jones (yellow card) 28' (goal) 55'; Arrúa 42'	Stadium: Wicks Family Field at Joe Davis Stadium; Referee: Elvis Osmanovic

September 13 27	Chattanooga FC	4–1	Atlanta United 2	Chattanooga, Tennessee
3:00 PM EDT	Krehl 10'; McGrath 62'; Husakiwsky 65'; Louis Jean (yellow card) 68'; Barker John 86'	Report	Sibrian (yellow card) 23'; Senanou (yellow card) 85'; Kovac 89'	Stadium: Finley Stadium; Attendance: 3,107; Referee: Jose Lara

September 20 28	Chicago Fire FC II	0–1	Chattanooga FC	Bridgeview, Illinois
2:00 PM EDT	Pineda (yellow card) 3'; Williams (yellow card) 37'	Report	McGrath 52'; Krehl (yellow card) 84'	Stadium: Seatgeek Stadium; Referee: Alex Beehler

==== Playoffs ====
October 18 Conference Quarterfinals	Chattanooga FC	3–1	NYCFC II	Chattanooga, Tennessee
5:00 PM EDT	Krehl 31'; Sorenson 79'; Cohen 90+7'	Report	Santos (yellow card) 29'; Arroyave 53'	Stadium: Finley Stadium; Attendance: 3,131; Referee: Edson Carvajal

October 25 Conference Semifinals	Chattanooga FC	3–1	CT United FC	Chattanooga, Tennessee
5:00 PM ET	Jones (yellow card) 59'; Robertson 61'; Krehl 70'; Louis-Jean 83'	Report	Sserwadda (yellow card) 60'; Tanyi 65'	Stadium: Finley Stadium; Attendance: 3,051; Referee: Gerald Flores

November 1 Conference Final	Chattanooga FC	3–2	Columbus Crew 2	Chattanooga, Tennessee
5:00 PM ET	McGrath 45+3'; Barker John 71'; Sar-sar 90+5'	Report	Adams 12'; Gbamblé 31'; Nyeman (yellow card) 81'	Stadium: Finley Stadium; Attendance: 3,403; Referee: JC Griggs

November 8 MLS Next Pro Cup Final	Chattanooga FC	1–0	Los Angeles FC 2	Chattanooga, Tennessee
6:00 PM ET	Barker John 31'	Report	Guerra (yellow card) 76'	Stadium: Finley Stadium; Attendance: 10,228; Referee: Rodrigo Albuquerque

==== Lamar Hunt US Open Cup ====
March 18 First Round	Chattanooga FC	2–1	Kalonji Pro-Profile	Chattanooga, Tennessee
6:00 PM EDT	Ortiz 45+1'; Mohand 46'; Ancelin (yellow card) 79'	Report	Kalonji 13'; Medard (yellow card) 36'; Joyner (yellow card) 90+4'	Stadium: Finley Stadium; Attendance: 2,139; Referee: Amin Hadzic

April 1 Second Round	Chattanooga FC	1–0	Tennessee Tempo FC	Chattanooga, Tennessee
6:00 PM EDT	Koehler 44'; Gordon (yellow card) 90+2'	Report	Bedai (yellow card) 24'	Stadium: Finley Stadium; Attendance: 2,857; Referee: Kyle Johnston

April 15 Round of 32	Chattanooga FC	1–3	Atlanta United	Chattanooga, Tennessee
7:30 PM EDT	Tcheuyap 6'; Robertson (yellow card) 78'	Report	Togashi 21'; Edwards (yellow card) 23'; Picault 64'; Amador 75'; Brennan (yellow card) 78'	Stadium: Finley Stadium; Attendance: 5,292; Referee: Igor Bych

=== Statistics ===
Numbers after plus-sign(+) denote appearances as a substitute.

==== Appearances and goals ====
No.	Pos	Nat	Player	Total		MLS Next Pro		U.S. Open Cup		MLSNP Playoffs	
No.	Pos	Nat	Player	Apps	Goals	Apps	Goals	Apps	Goals	Apps	Goals
1	GK	(Switzerland) SUI	Eldin Jakupović	32	0	27+0	0	1+0	0	4+0	0
2	DF	(Canada) CAN	Yves Tcheuyap	33	1	23+3	0	3+0	1	4+0	0
3	MF	(United States) USA	Tate Robertson	35	9	27+1	8	2+1	0	4+0	1
4	DF	(United States) USA	Mattias Hanchard	24	0	19+3	0	1+1	0	0+0	0
5	DF	(Argentina) ARG	Farid Sar-Sar	34	3	27+0	2	3+0	0	4+0	1
6	MF	(Haiti) HAI	Steeve Louis-Jean	19	2	11+5	1	0+0	0	1+2	1
7	FW	(United States) USA	Anthony Garcia	29	0	7+15	0	1+2	0	0+4	0
9	MF	(Grenada) GRN	Damien Barker John	32	10	23+3	8	2+0	0	4+0	2
10	MF	(United States) USA	Daniel Mangarov	34	3	22+6	2	2+0	0	4+0	1
11	MF	(Algeria) ALG	Ameziane Sid Mohand	14	2	4+8	1	1+1	1	0+0	0
13	DF	(United States) USA	Anthony Sorenson	30	1	22+1	0	3+0	0	3+1	1
14	DF	(United States) USA	Nathan Koehler	24	2	10+8	1	2+0	1	4+0	0
17	MF	(Honduras) HON	Darwin Ortiz	5	1	0+2	0	1+2	1	0+0	0
18	MF	(United States) USA	Luke Husakiwsky	27	2	12+9	2	0+2	0	1+3	0
19	FW	(Jamaica) JAM	Ashton Gordon	15	0	1+11	0	1+2	0	0+0	0
20	MF	(Ghana) GHA	Kenneth Tsokli	0	0	0+0	0	0+0	0	0+0	0
21	MF	(Ghana) GHA	Francis Amoateng	3	0	0+3	0	0+0	0	0+0	0
23	FW	(United States) USA	Alex Krehl	34	20	26+1	18	3+0	0	4+0	2
26	FW	(United States) USA	Keegan Ancelin	15	1	2+10	1	1+2	0	0+0	0
29	FW	(Argentina) ARG	Alexis Arrúa	20	1	4+13	1	0+0	0	1+2	0
30	MF	(United States) USA	Colin Thomas	2	0	0+2	0	0+0	0	0+0	0
33	MF	(England) ENG	Alex McGrath	26	8	19+3	7	1+0	0	2+1	1
38	DF	(Argentina) ARG	Junior Flores	2	0	0+2	0	0+0	0	0+0	0
47	MF	(Sierra Leone) SLE	Isaiah Jones	30	3	17+6	3	3+0	0	4+0	0
51	GK	(United States) USA	Michael Barrueta	0	0	0+0	0	0+0	0	0+0	0
77	GK	(United States) USA	Griffin Huff	3	0	1+0	0	2+0	0	0+0	0
90	FW	(United States) USA	Yuval Cohen	22	2	4+15	1	0+0	0	0+3	1

- Last updated: November 8, 2026
- Source: https://www.mlsnextpro.com/clubs/chattanooga-fc/stats/#season=MLS-SEA-0001K9&competition=mls-next-pro&club=MLS-CLU-00003H&statType=general&position=all

==== Top scorers ====
Rank	Position	Number	Name	MLS Next Pro	U.S. Open Cup	MLSNP Playoffs	Total
1	MF	23	(United States) Alex Krehl	18	0	2	20
2	MF	9	(Grenada) Damien Barker John	8	0	2	10
3	DF	3	(United States) Tate Robertson	8	0	1	9
4	MF	33	(England) Alex McGrath	7	0	1	8
5	MF	47	(Sierra Leone) Isaiah Jones	3	0	0	3
5	DF	5	(Argentina) Farid Sar-sar	2	0	1	3
7	MF	10	(United States) Daniel Mangarov	2	0	0	2
7	MF	18	(United States) Luke Husakiwsky	2	0	0	2
7	MF	11	(Algeria) Ameziane Sid Mohand	1	1	0	2
7	DF	14	(United States) Nathan Koehler	1	1	0	2
7	MF	6	(Haiti) Steeve Louis-Jean	1	0	0	1
7	FW	90	(United States) Yuval Cohen	1	0	1	2
13	FW	26	(United States) Keegan Ancelin	1	0	0	1
13	FW	29	(United States) Alexis Arrúa	1	0	0	1
13	DF	2	(Canada) Yves Tcheuyap	0	1	0	1
13	MF	17	(Honduras) Darwin Ortiz	0	1	0	1
13	DF	13	(United States) Anthony Sorenson	0	0	1	1
Total				56	4	10	70

- Last updated: November 8, 2026
- Source: https://www.mlsnextpro.com/clubs/chattanooga-fc/stats/#season=MLS-SEA-0001K9&competition=mls-next-pro&club=MLS-CLU-00003H&statType=general&position=all

==== Top assists ====
Rank	Position	Number	Name	MLS Next Pro	U.S. Open Cup	MLSNP Playoffs	Total
1	DF	3	(United States) Tate Robertson	9	1	1	11
2	MF	10	(United States) Daniel Mangarov	7	1	1	9
3	MF	23	(United States) Alex Krehl	3	0	1	4
4	DF	2	(Canada) Yves Tcheuyap	3	0	0	3
4	MF	9	(Grenada) Damien Barker John	2	0	1	3
6	DF	6	(Haiti) Steeve Louis-Jean	2	0	0	2
6	FW	19	(Jamaica) Ashton Gordon	2	0	0	2
6	DF	13	(United States) Anthony Sorenson	1	0	1	2
9	DF	5	(Argentina) Farid Sar-sar	1	0	0	1
9	MF	18	(United States) Luke Husakiwsky	1	0	0	1
9	FW	29	(Argentina) Alexis Arrúa	1	0	0	1
9	MF	33	(England) Alex McGrath	1	0	0	1
9	FW	7	(United States) Anthony Garcia	0	0	1	1
Total				36	2	6	44

- Last updated: November 8, 2026
- Source: https://www.mlsnextpro.com/clubs/chattanooga-fc/stats/#season=MLS-SEA-0001K9&competition=mls-next-pro&club=MLS-CLU-00003H&statType=general&position=all

==== Disciplinary record ====
No.	Pos.	Player	MLS Next Pro			U.S. Open Cup			MLSNP Playoffs			Total		
No.	Pos.	Player	Yellow card	(yellow card) (yellow-red card)	Red card	Yellow card	(yellow card) (yellow-red card)	Red card	Yellow card	(yellow card) (yellow-red card)	Red card	Yellow card	(yellow card) (yellow-red card)	Red card
1	GK	(Switzerland) Eldin Jakupović	0	0	0	0	0	0	0	0	0	0	0	0
2	DF	(Canada) Yves Tcheuyap	4	1	0	0	0	0	0	0	0	4	1	0
3	DF	(United States) Tate Robertson	4	0	0	1	0	0	0	0	0	5	0	0
4	DF	(United States) Mattias Hanchard	2	0	0	0	0	0	0	0	0	2	0	0
5	DF	(Argentina) Farid Sar-Sar	6	0	0	0	0	0	0	0	0	6	0	0
6	MF	(Haiti) Steeve Louis Jean	3	0	0	0	0	0	0	0	0	3	0	0
7	FW	(United States) Anthony Garcia	1	0	0	0	0	0	0	0	0	1	0	0
9	MF	(Grenada) Damien Barker John	1	0	0	0	0	0	0	0	0	1	0	0
10	MF	(United States) Daniel Mangarov	3	0	0	0	0	0	0	0	0	3	0	0
11	FW	(Algeria) Ameziane Sid Mohand	2	0	0	0	0	0	0	0	0	2	0	0
13	DF	(United States) Anthony Sorenson	5	1	0	0	0	0	0	0	0	5	1	0
14	DF	(United States) Nathan Koehler	2	0	0	0	0	0	0	0	0	2	0	0
17	MF	(Honduras) Darwin Ortiz	0	0	0	0	0	0	0	0	0	0	0	0
18	MF	(United States) Luke Husakiwsky	2	0	0	0	0	0	0	0	0	2	0	0
19	FW	(Jamaica) Ashton Gordon	0	0	0	1	0	0	0	0	0	1	0	0
20	MF	(Ghana) Kenneth Tsokli	0	0	0	0	0	0	0	0	0	0	0	0
21	MF	(Ghana) Francis Amoateng	0	0	0	0	0	0	0	0	0	0	0	0
23	FW	(United States) Alex Krehl	4	0	0	0	0	0	0	0	0	4	0	0
26	FW	(United States) Keegan Ancelin	0	0	0	1	0	0	0	0	0	1	0	0
29	FW	(Argentina) Alexis Arrúa	1	0	0	0	0	0	0	0	0	1	0	0
33	MF	(England) Alex McGrath	4	0	0	0	0	0	0	0	0	4	0	0
38	DF	(Argentina) Junior Flores	0	0	0	0	0	0	0	0	0	0	0	0
47	MF	(Sierra Leone) Isaiah Jones	6	0	0	0	0	0	1	0	0	7	0	0
51	GK	(United States) Michael Barrueta	0	0	0	0	0	0	0	0	0	0	0	0
77	GK	(United States) Griffin Huff	0	0	0	0	0	0	0	0	0	0	0	0
90	FW	(United States) Yuval Cohen	0	0	0	0	0	0	0	0	0	0	0	0
Total			50	2	0	3	0	0	1	0	0	54	2	0

- Last updated: October 25, 2026
- Source: https://www.mlsnextpro.com/clubs/chattanooga-fc/stats/#season=MLS-SEA-0001K9&competition=mls-next-pro&club=MLS-CLU-00003H&statType=general&position=all

== Awards and honors ==
=== Weekly Awards ===
==== MLS NEXT Pro Team of the Matchweek ====
Week	Ref
14	
21	
26	
28	

=== Monthly Awards ===
==== MLS NEXT Pro Coach of the Month ====
Month	Coach	Ref
September	(Jamaica) Richard Dixon	

=== Yearly Awards ===
==== MLS Next Pro Best XI ====
Player	Position	Ref
(United States) Alex Krehl	Forward	
