= Damián Rodríguez =

Damián Domínguez may refer to:

- Damián Rodríguez (footballer, born 1974), Uruguayan football defender
- Damián Rodríguez (footballer, born 2003), Spanish football midfielder
