= Callum Watson =

Callum Watson may refer to:

- Callum Watson (skier) (born 1989), Australian cross-country skier
- Callum Watson (footballer) (born 2000), English footballer
- Callum Watson (character), fictional character on the British TV series Footballers' Wives
