= Leandro Soria =

American soccer player

Personal information
- Date of birth: October 29, 2004 (age 22)
- Place of birth: New York City, United States
- Height: 5 ft 9 in (1.75 m)
- Position: Winger

Youth career
- Godoy Cruz

Senior career*
Years	Team	Apps	(Gls)
2021–2023	Godoy Cruz	2	(0)
2024–2025	Philadelphia Union II	0	(0)
- * Club domestic league appearances and goals as of 11 December 2021

Leandro Soria (born October 29, 2004) is an American professional soccer player who plays as a winger.

== Early life ==
Born in Queens, New York City, from an Argentine family who had left their country a few years earlier during the great depression, Soria moved back to Argentina when he was two years old.

== Club career ==
Soria made his professional debut for Godoy Cruz on November 6, 2021, replacing Matías Ramírez during a 2–0 home defeat against Primera División contenders Talleres de Córdoba.

== International career ==
A dual citizen of the United States and Argentina, Soria stated his desire to play for the former at under-20 level in November 2021.
