= Taylor Gray (soccer) =

American soccer player (born 1998)

Personal information
- Date of birth: January 28, 1998 (age 28)
- Place of birth: Hughesville, Maryland, US
- Height: 6 ft 1 in (1.85 m)
- Positions: Midfielder; forward

Team information
- Current team: FC Naples
- Number: 7

Youth career
- D.C. United

College career
Years	Team	Apps	(Gls)
2016–2017	Lees–McRae Bobcats	38	(4)
2018–2019	Reinhardt Eagles		(12)

Senior career*
Years	Team	Apps	(Gls)
2017	West Virginia Chaos	8	(0)
2018–2019	Tri-Cities Otters	26	(8)
2021	Maryland Bobcats	17	(1)
2022–2024	Chattanooga FC	56	(11)
2025	Tormenta FC	23	(1)
2026–	FC Naples	21	(0)
- * Club domestic league appearances and goals as of November 1, 2026

Taylor Gray (born January 28, 1998) is an American professional soccer player who plays for USL League One club FC Naples.

== Early life ==
Gray played youth soccer with the D.C. United Academy.

== College career ==
In 2016, Gray began attending Lees–McRae College, where he played for the men's soccer team. He made his collegiate debut and recorded his first assist on September 1, 2016, against the Anderson Trojans. He scored his first collegiate goal on October 12, 2016, against the Catawba Indians.

In 2018, he began attending Reinhardt University, where he played for the men's soccer team. In 2018, he was named to the All-Appalachian Athletic Conference Second Team, after scoring five goals and adding three assists. In 2019, after scoring seven goals and adding seven assists during his senior season, he was named to the All-Appalachian Athletic Conference Second Team and was named the team's Offensive Player of the Year.

== Club career ==
In 2017, Gray played with the West Virginia Chaos in the Premier Development League.

In 2018 and 2019, Gray played with the Tri-Cities Otters. In 2019, he had a league best five consecutive game goal scoring streak and was named to the USL2 Eastern Conference Team of the Season. He was also named one of 12 finalists nationwide in the 'Global Greats' honors in 2019, finishing as runner-up. He was set to return to the team in 2020, however, the season was cancelled due to the COVID-19 pandemic.

In May 2021, he joined the Maryland Bobcats FC first team in NISA, after beginning the year with their reserve squad in the Eastern Premier Soccer League.

In 2022, he joined Chattanooga FC in NISA, after having previously trialed with the team in 2019, but failing to make the team. On May 21, 2022, he scored a hat trick in a 4–2 victory over Bay Cities FC. He was named to the NISA Best XI in 2022. He spent much of the 2023 season injured, before returning to full health in 2024 as the team moved leagues to play in MLS Next Pro.

Gray signed with USL League One club Tormenta FC in January 2025.

On December 22, 2025, Gray joined fellow USL League One club FC Naples.

== Career statistics ==
As of August 3, 2024

Club	Season	League			Playoffs		Domestic Cup		Other		Total	
Club	Season	Division	Apps	Goals	Apps	Goals	Apps	Goals	Apps	Goals	Apps	Goals
West Virginia United	2017	Premier Development League	8	0	–		–		–		8	0
Tri-Cities Otters	2018	Premier Development League	12	1	–		–		–		12	1
Tri-Cities Otters	2019	USL League Two	14	7	–		–		–		14	7
Tri-Cities Otters	Total		26	8	0	0	0	0	0	0	26	8
Maryland Bobcats FC	2020–21	National Independent Soccer Association	4	0	–		–		?	?	4	0
Maryland Bobcats FC	2021	National Independent Soccer Association	13	1	–		–		?	?	13	1
Maryland Bobcats FC	Total		17	1	0	0	0	0	0	0	17	1
Chattanooga FC	2022	National Independent Soccer Association	26	6	1	0	2	1	?	?	29	7
Chattanooga FC	2023	National Independent Soccer Association	4	1	1	0	2	0	–		7	1
Chattanooga FC	2024	MLS Next Pro	20	2	0	0	1	0	–		21	2
Chattanooga FC	Total		50	9	2	0	5	1	0	0	57	10
Career total			101	18	2	0	5	1	0	0	108	19
