= Isaiah Jones (footballer, born 2006) =

Sierra Leonean footballer (born 2006)

Personal information
- Date of birth: 8 April 2006 (age 20)
- Place of birth: Freetown, Sierra Leone
- Position: Midfielder

Team information
- Current team: Chattanooga FC (on loan from Nashville SC)
- Number: 47

Youth career
- 2020–2023: Nashville SC

Senior career*
Years	Team	Apps	(Gls)
2023–	Nashville SC	2	(0)
2023–2025	→ Huntsville City FC (loan)	43	(1)
2026–	→ Chattanooga FC (loan)	21	(3)
- * Club domestic league appearances and goals

Isaiah Jones (born 8 April 2006) is a Sierra Leonean professional footballer who plays as a midfielder for Major League Soccer club Nashville SC.

== Early life ==
Jones was born in 2006 in Sierra Leone. He grew up in Thompson's Station, Tennessee.

== Career ==
Jones started his career with American side Nashville SC. In 2023, he was sent on loan to American side Huntsville City FC.

== Personal life ==
Jones was adopted by American parents. He has ten siblings, including New York City FC forward Malachi Jones.
