= Anthony Sorenson =

American soccer player (born 2003)

Personal information
- Full name: Anthony Sorenson
- Date of birth: January 25, 2003 (age 23)
- Place of birth: Port au Prince, Haiti
- Height: 5 ft 6 in (1.68 m)
- Position: Defender

Team information
- Current team: Chattanooga FC
- Number: 13

Youth career
- 2016–2019: Michigan Wolves
- 2019–2022: Philadelphia Union

Senior career*
| Years | Team | Apps | (Gls) |
| 2020–2023 | Philadelphia Union II | 33 | (1) |
| 2021–2023 | Philadelphia Union | 0 | (0) |
| 2024–2025 | Charlotte Independence | 44 | (1) |
| 2026– | Chattanooga FC | 0 | (0) |

International career
| 2018 | United States U16 | | |
- * Club domestic league appearances and goals as of October 31, 2025

Anthony Sorenson (born January 25, 2003) is a professional soccer player who plays as a defender for MLS Next Pro club Chattanooga FC. Born in Haiti, he is a youth international for the United States.

== Club career ==
Sorenson began his youth career with Crew SC Academy Wolves, before moving to the Philadelphia Union in 2019. He made his debut with the club's reserve side, Philadelphia Union II, on August 1, 2020, against the Pittsburgh Riverhounds. In December 2021, he joined the first team, as an extreme hardship short-term loan ahead of a playoff match against New York City FC, as 11 players entered COVID-19 health and safety protocols.

On January 25, 2022, Sorenson signed a homegrown player contract with Philadelphia Union's first team roster.

On December 4, 2023, the Philadelphia Union announced that they declined their option on Sorenson.

On 6 March 2024, Sorenson joined USL League One club Charlotte Independence.

== Career statistics ==
=== Club ===
As of matches played October 6, 2020

Appearances and goals by club, season and competition
| Club | Season | League | | | National cup | | Other | | Total | |
| Club | Season | Division | Apps | Goals | Apps | Goals | Apps | Goals | Apps | Goals |
|---|---|---|---|---|---|---|---|---|---|---|
| Philadelphia Union II | 2020 | USL Championship | 12 | 1 | — | — | — | — | 12 | 1 |
| Career total | | | 12 | 1 | 0 | 0 | 0 | 0 | 12 | 1 |
