= Jesus Ibarra =

American soccer player (born 1997)

Personal information
- Date of birth: November 10, 1997 (age 29)
- Place of birth: San Diego, California, United States
- Height: 1.78 m (5 ft 10 in)
- Position: Midfielder

Team information
- Current team: Carolina Core FC
- Number: 22

Youth career
- 2013–2016: EWSA Hammers
- 2016: Wilmington Hammerheads

Senior career*
Years	Team	Apps	(Gls)
2018	West Virginia Alliance	13	(5)
2018	Greenville FC	7	(2)
2019–2020	Boden	25	(6)
2020	Charleston Battery	4	(0)
2021–2022	Greenville Triumph	46	(3)
2023–2025	Chattanooga FC	30	(10)
2025–	Carolina Core FC	7	(2)
- * Club domestic league appearances and goals as of December 13, 2024

Jesus Ibarra (born November 10, 1997) is an American soccer player who plays as a forward for Carolina Core FC in MLS Next Pro.

== Career ==
=== Charleston Battery ===
In February 2020, Ibarra joined USL Championship club Charleston Battery, the club's fourth signing prior to the 2020 USL Championship season. He made his league debut for the club on July 19, 2020, against the Birmingham Legion.

=== Greenville Triumph ===
In April 2021, Ibarra joined USL League One side Greenville Triumph SC ahead of the 2021 season. Ibarra signed a new contract with Triumph SC in January 2022.

=== Chattanooga FC ===
In June 2023, Ibarra signed with Chattanooga FC of the National Independent Soccer Association.
