= Keegan Ancelin =

American soccer player (born 2003)

Personal information
- Full name: Keegan Ancelin
- Date of birth: March 9, 2003 (age 23)
- Place of birth: Jacksonville, Florida, United States
- Height: 1.93 m (6 ft 4 in)
- Position: Forward

Team information
- Current team: Chattanooga
- Number: 26

Youth career
- –2024: Jacksonville Armada

College career
Years	Team	Apps	(Gls)
2021–2024	West Florida Argonauts	70	(37)

Senior career*
Years	Team	Apps	(Gls)
2025–	Chattanooga	37	(4)
2026	→ Drogheda United (loan)	8	(1)
- * Club domestic league appearances and goals as of 17:59, 10 November 2026 (UTC)

Keegan Ancelin (born 9 March 2003) is an American professional association footballer who plays as a forward for MLS Next Pro team Chattanooga.

== Club career ==
=== Early career ===
Ancelin is a native of Jacksonville, Florida and attended Duncan U. Fletcher High School and played in the academy at Jacksonville Armada before starting at University of West Florida in 2021 where he majored in Exercise Science and played for the West Florida Argonauts, scoring 37 goals in 70 appearances by the time he finished up in 2024. In April 2024, during his senior year in college, Ancelin was also announced as part of the Jacksonville Armada U-23 squad for the 2024 National Premier Soccer League season.

=== Chattanooga ===
On 1 February 2025, Ancelin was announced as a new signing for MLS Next Pro side Chattanooga FC. On 8 March 2025, he scored after just 121 seconds in his first appearance for the club in an eventual 2–1 victory away to Inter Miami II. He scored 4 goals in 42 appearances in all competitions before departing the club on loan in July 2026.

==== Drogheda United loan ====
On 15 July 2026, it was announced that Ancelin has signed for League of Ireland Premier Division club Drogheda United on loan until the end of the season. On 16 August 2026, he scored his first goals for the club, scoring twice in a 3–0 win away to College Corinthians in the FAI Cup. On 28 August 2026, he scored his first league goal for the club, opening the scoring in the Louth Derby as his side were defeated 3–2 at home to Dundalk. He scored 3 goals in 12 appearances in all competitions during his loan spell, as the club was relegated following a 2–1 defeat to UCD in the Promotion/Relegation Playoff.

== Career statistics ==
As of match played 7 November 2026

Appearances and goals by club, season and competition
Club	Season	League			National cup (Note: Includes U.S. Open Cup, FAI Cup)		Other		Total	
Club	Season	Division	Apps	Goals	Apps	Goals	Apps	Goals	Apps	Goals
Chattanooga	2025	MLS Next Pro	25	3	2	0	1 (Note: Appearance in MLS Next Pro playoffs)	0	28	3
Chattanooga	2026	MLS Next Pro	12	1	3	0	–		14	1
Chattanooga	Total		37	4	5	0	1	0	43	4
Drogheda United	2026	LOI Premier Division	8	1	3	2	1 (Note: Appearance in League of Ireland play-offs)	0	12	3
Total			45	5	8	2	2	0	55	7
