= Magic Smalls =

English footballer (born 2006)

Personal information
- Date of birth: 21 August 2006 (age 20)
- Place of birth: London, England
- Height: 6 ft 1 in (1.85 m)
- Position: Midfielder

Team information
- Current team: Crown Legacy FC

Youth career
- Needham Market
- 2025–: Charlotte FC

Senior career*
Years	Team	Apps	(Gls)
2023	Downham Town		
2023–2024	March Town United		
2024–2025	Stowmarket Town		
2025–	Crown Legacy FC	10	(2)
- * Club domestic league appearances and goals as of 10:52, 23 March 2026 (UTC)

Magic Smalls (born 21 August 2006) is an English professional footballer who plays as a midfielder for MLS Next Pro club Crown Legacy FC.

== Early life ==
When he was 12, he was offered a two-year academy contract with Arsenal, before joining the youth teams of Needham Market.

== Club career ==
In 2023, he began playing with Downham Town in the ninth tier Eastern Counties Football League Premier Division, and scored the winning goal in a 2–1 victory over Newmarket Town in the Second Qualifying Round of the 2023–24 FA Vase.

In November 2023, he joined March Town United in the ninth-tier United Counties League Premier Division South. In his first match, he won a free kick that led to the winning goal, before scoring the winning goal himself in the next two matches.

The following season he joined Stowmarket Town in the Eastern Counties Football League Premier Division.

At age 18, he moved to the United States, joining Crown Legacy FC in MLS Next Pro. On 7 March 2025, he made his professional debut for Crown Legacy in a match against New York City FC II, playing as an academy call-up. On 19 April 2025, he scored his first professional goal in a 2–1 loss to Chattanooga FC.

== Personal life ==
He is the younger brother of fellow professional footballer Tyger Smalls.
