= Jesse Williams (footballer, born 2001) =

Trinidadian footballer (born 2001)

Personal information
- Full name: Jesse Elijah Williams
- Date of birth: 18 May 2001 (age 25)
- Place of birth: Trinidad
- Position: Defender

Team information
- Current team: AC Port of Spain

Youth career
- La Horquetta Rangers
- Central
- 2020–2022: Coleraine

Senior career*
Years	Team	Apps	(Gls)
2022	Pittsburgh Riverhounds	6	(0)
2023	Des Moines Menace	10	(0)
2023	Central Valley Fuego	7	(0)
2024–2025	Chattanooga FC	16	(0)

International career^{‡}
2018	Trinidad and Tobago U21	3	(0)
2021–	Trinidad and Tobago	10	(0)
- * Club domestic league appearances and goals as of 15:35, 15 October 2023 (UTC) ‡ National team caps and goals as of 18:04, 7 August 2023 (UTC)

Jesse Elijah Williams (born 18 May 2001) is a Trinidadian professional footballer who plays as a defender for AC Port of Spain and the Trinidad and Tobago national football team.

== Club career ==
Williams played for local sides La Horquetta Rangers and Central in Trinidad and Tobago. In late 2020, he moved to Northern Ireland and joined professional side Coleraine, alongside compatriot Gary Griffith. In January 2022, after just over a year with Coleraine, he moved to America to join USL Championship side Pittsburgh Riverhounds, signing a one-year deal.

After the Pittsburgh Riverhounds refused the one-year extension on his deal, Williams dropped down to the USL League Two, signing with Des Moines Menace. However, mid-way through the 2023 season, he moved to USL League One side Central Valley Fuego.

On 15 December 2023, Williams signed with Chattanooga FC ahead of the club's first season competing in MLS Next Pro. On January 6 2025 Williams and Chattanooga FC agreed to a mutual termination of the players contract.

== Career statistics ==
=== Club ===
As of 7 August 2023.

Appearances and goals by club, season and competition
Club	Season	League			Cup		Other		Total	
Club	Season	Division	Apps	Goals	Apps	Goals	Apps	Goals	Apps	Goals
Pittsburgh Riverhounds	2022	USL Championship	6	0	1 (Note: Appearances in the U.S. Open Cup)	0	0	0	7	0
Central Valley Fuego	2023	USL League One	1	0	0	0	0	0	1	0
Career total			7	0	1	0	0	0	8	0

=== International ===
As of 7 August 2023.

National team	Year	Apps	Goals
Trinidad and Tobago	2021	3	0
Trinidad and Tobago	2022	4	0
Trinidad and Tobago	2023	3	0
Total		10	0
