= Callum Watson (footballer) =

English footballer (born 2000)

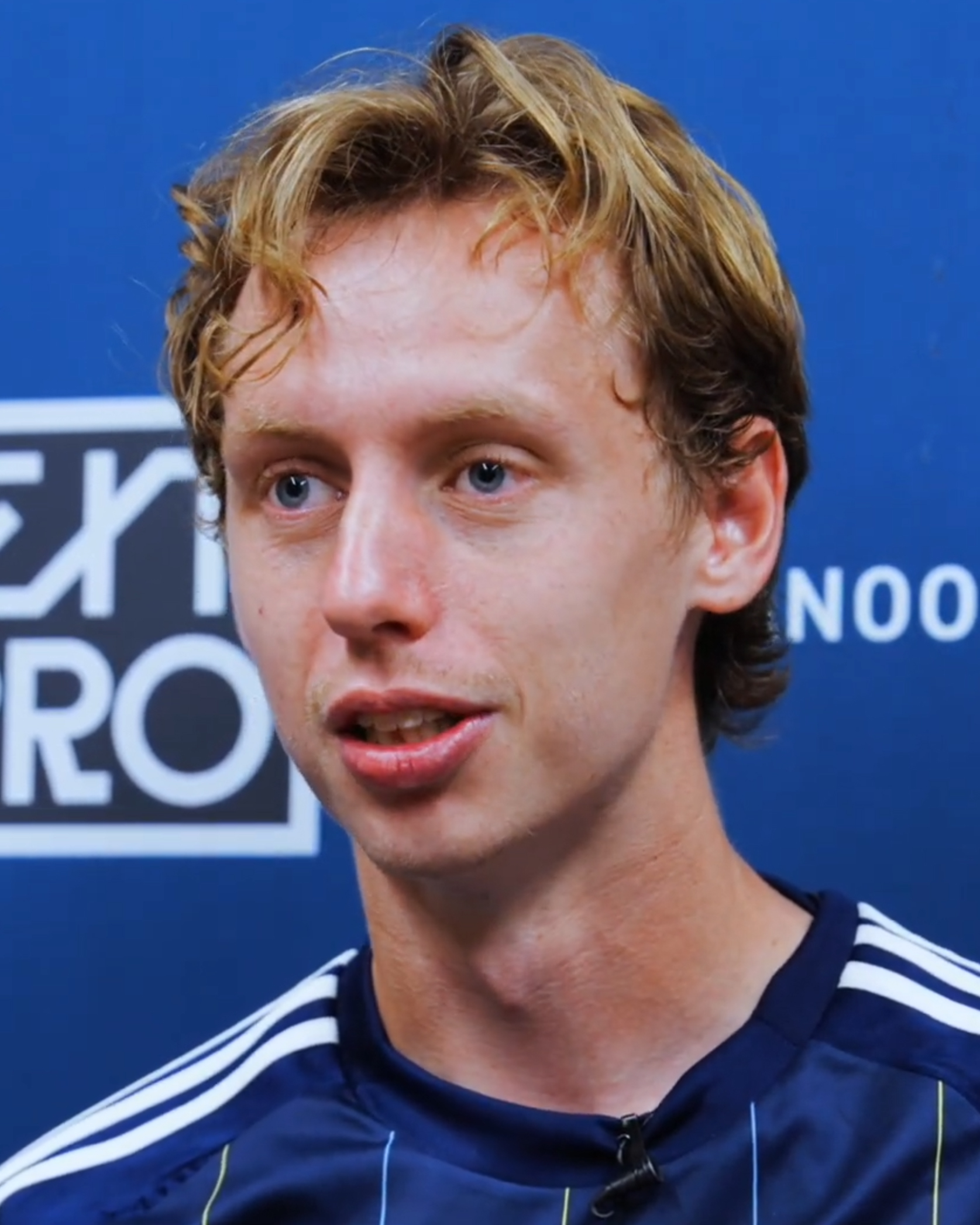
- Callum in 2024

Personal information
- Date of birth: 28 February 2000 (age 26)
- Place of birth: Chelmsford, England
- Height: 1.80 m (5 ft 11 in)
- Position: Midfielder

Youth career
- 2011–2016: Colchester United
- 2016: AFC Sudbury

College career
Years	Team	Apps	(Gls)
2018–2019	Hastings Broncos	38	(14)
2020–2022	Creighton Bluejays	51	(6)

Senior career*
Years	Team	Apps	(Gls)
2016–2017	AFC Sudbury	7	(0)
2023	AFC Sudbury	0	(0)
2023	HFX Wanderers	24	(3)
2024–2025	Chattanooga FC	43	(1)
- * Club domestic league appearances and goals as of 8 November 2025

Callum Watson (born 28 February 2000) is an English professional football player.

== Early life ==
Watson played youth football with Colchester United for five years, until he was sixteen, when he was released due to being too small. Afterwards, he joined the AFC Sudbury academy program.

== College career ==
In 2018, Watson headed to the United States, through the U.S Sports Scholarships organization, which helps English footballers attend an American post-secondary institution to earn a degree and play college soccer. He joined Hastings College and played for their men's soccer team in the NAIA. He made his debut on October 26, 2018 against the Bethany Bison, scoring his first goal and adding two assists in a 5-0 victory. In his first season, he won the conference title as well as the conference tournament title. He was named a GPAC First Team All-Star in both 2018 and 2019. In 2019, he helped the team to a second place finish at the national NAIA Men's Soccer Championship and earned All-Tournament Team honours and was also named a First Team All-America. During his two seasons with Hastings, he scored 14 goals and added 28 assists in 38 matches.

In December 2019, it was announced that he would transfer to Creighton University, beginning classes in January, and joining the men's soccer team in the NCAA in the fall. He recorded his first assist on March 17, 2021 against the Butler Bulldogs. On March 29, 2021, he scored his first goal for Creighton in a 3-1 victory over the Kansas City Roos. He was named to the All-Big East Second Team for the 2021 Spring season (which occurred as the regular 2020 fall season was postponed due to the COVID-19 pandemic). In October 2021, he was named the Big East Offensive Player of the Week. After the 2021 Fall season, he was named to the USCA All-East Region Third Team as well as the All-BIG EAST Second Team for the second time. After his final season in 2022, he was named to the All-Big East Third Team.

== Club career ==
On 6 October 2016, made his senior debut with AFC Sudbury in the seventh tier Isthmian League Premier Division against Kingstonian. He made a further ten appearances the following season, including scoring in an FA Trophy draw against Aylesbury United on 7 October 2017.

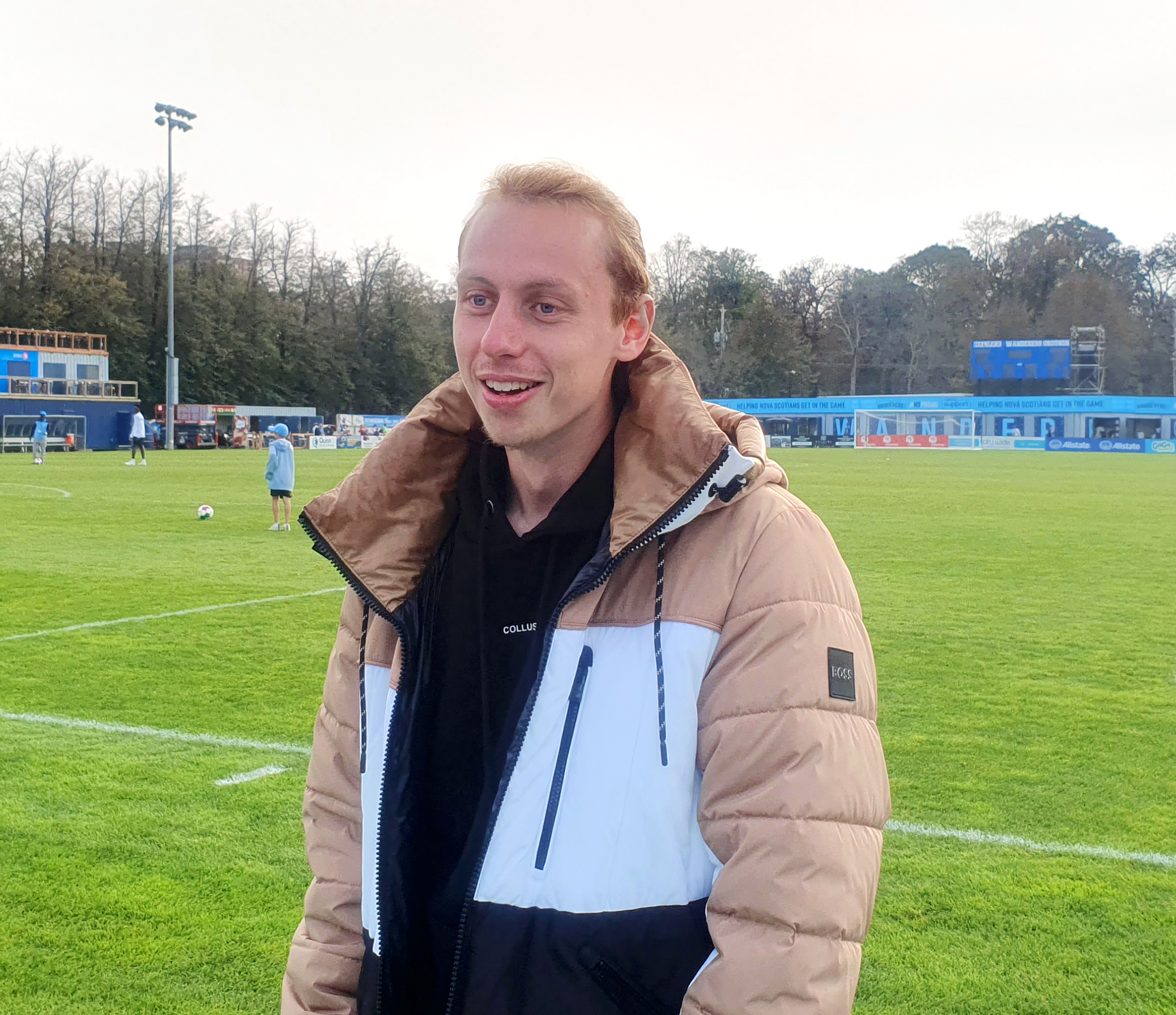
Watson with HFX Wanderers FC in 2023

In January 2023, he briefly returned to AFC Sudbury, now in the eighth tier Isthmian League North Division. However, he soon after signed a professional contract and instead remained with Sudbury on a training stint, without appearing in matches to avoid injury risk.

On January 25, 2023, Watson signed with Canadian Premier League club HFX Wanderers for the 2023 season, with an option for 2024. He had received offers to attend preseason with Major League Soccer clubs Real Salt Lake and Houston Dynamo FC, but instead opted to sign the guaranteed contract with the Wanderers instead. On 10 June 2023, Watson scored a brace in a 2-0 victory over Valour FC to help the Wanderers earn their first victory of the season, earning league Team of the Week honours for the first time. In his sole season with the club, he scored three goals and added an assist in 26 appearances, across all competitions.

In January 2024, Watson transferred to Chattanooga FC in the MLS Next Pro for an undisclosed fee. On 6 October 2024, he scored his first goal in a match against New York Red Bulls II.

== Career statistics ==
As of 8 November 2025

Appearances and goals by club, season and competition
Club	Season	League			Playoffs		Domestic Cup		Other		Total	
Club	Season	Division	Apps	Goals	Apps	Goals	Apps	Goals	Apps	Goals	Apps	Goals
AFC Sudbury	2016–17	Isthmian League Premier	1	0	—		0	0	0	0	1	0
AFC Sudbury	2017–18	Isthmian League North	6	0	—		1 (Note: Appearances in qualification for the FA Cup)	0	3 (Note: Appearances in qualification for the FA Trophy)	1	10	1
AFC Sudbury	Total		7	0	0	0	1	0	3	1	11	1
HFX Wanderers	2023	Canadian Premier League	24	3	1	0	1	0	—		26	3
Chattanooga FC	2024	USL Championship	17	1	—		1	0	—		18	1
Chattanooga FC	2025	USL Championship	25	0	1	0	2	0	—		28	0
Chattanooga FC	Total		43	1	1	0	3	0	0	0	47	1
Career total			73	4	2	0	5	0	3	1	83	5
