= Damián Rodríguez (footballer, born 1974) =

Brazilian-born Uruguayan footballer (born 1974)

Damian Rodríguez
Personal information
- Full name: Oscar Damián Rodríguez Cantos
- Date of birth: July 27, 1974 (age 52)
- Place of birth: Porto Alegre, Brazil
- Height: 1.82 m (6 ft 0 in)
- Position: Defender

Senior career*
Years	Team	Apps	(Gls)
1992	14 de Julho		
1993–1995	Nacional		
1995–1996	CSD Español	1	(0)
1996–1997	Godoy Cruz		
1997–2002	Nacional	99	(7)
2002–2003	Shakhtar Donetsk	8	(1)
2002	→ Shakhtar-2 Donetsk	2	(0)
2003	Dorados de Sinaloa		
2004	América de Cali		
2005	Cienciano del Cuzco	10	(0)
2006–2007	Nacional	3	(0)
2007–2008	Central Español	12	(1)

International career
2000–2002	Uruguay	3	(0)
- * Club domestic league appearances and goals

Oscar Damián Rodríguez Cantos (born 27 July 1974) is a Uruguayan footballer.

== Early life ==
Rodriguez moved to Uruguay from Brazil at the age of two.
