= Andrés Jiménez (soccer) =

American-Colombian soccer player

Personal information
- Full name: Andrés Jiménez Aranzazu
- Date of birth: March 9, 2000 (age 26)
- Place of birth: Miami, Florida, United States
- Height: 1.77 m (5 ft 10 in)
- Position: Midfielder

Team information
- Current team: Ponce FC
- Number: 6

Youth career
- 2013–2019: Envigado

Senior career*
Years	Team	Apps	(Gls)
2019–2022	Envigado	11	(0)
2023	Las Vegas Lights	34	(0)
2024–2025	Chattanooga FC	28	(0)
2025–2026	Ponce FC	2	(1)

International career
2018	United States U20	1	(0)
- * Club domestic league appearances and goals as of February 16, 2025

Andrés Jiménez Aranzazu (born March 9, 2000) is an American soccer player who currently plays as a midfielder for O&M FC.

== Club career ==
Born March 9, 2000, in Miami, Florida, Jiménez started his career with Envigado in 2013. Jiménez was announced as a new signing for USL Championship side Las Vegas Lights on January 25, 2023.

== Career statistics ==
=== Club ===
As of January 25, 2022.

Club	Season	League			Cup		Continental		Other		Total	
Club	Season	Division	Apps	Goals	Apps	Goals	Apps	Goals	Apps	Goals	Apps	Goals
Envigado	2019	Categoría Primera A	0	0	1 (Note: Appearances in the Copa Colombia)	0	0	0	0	0	1	0
Envigado	2020	Categoría Primera A	0	0	0	0	0	0	0	0	0	0
Envigado	2021	Categoría Primera A	0	0	0	0	0	0	0	0	0	0
Envigado	2022	Categoría Primera A	1	0	0	0	0	0	0	0	1	0
Las Vegas Lights FC	2023	USL Championship	0	0	0	0	0	0	0	0	0	0
Chattanooga FC	2024	MLS Next Pro	0	0	0	0	0	0	0	0	0	0
Chattanooga FC	2025	MLS Next Pro	0	0	0	0	0	0	0	0	0	0
Ponce FC	2026	Liga Puerto Rico Pro	0	0	0	0	0	0	0	0	0	0
Career total			1	0	1	0	0	0	0	0	2	0
