= Milo Garvanian =

American soccer player (born 2000)

Personal information
- Date of birth: January 17, 2000 (age 26)
- Place of birth: Albuquerque, New Mexico, United States
- Height: 1.85 m (6 ft 1 in)
- Positions: Defender; midfielder

Youth career
- –2017: Rio Rapids SC
- 2017–2018: Colorado Rapids

College career
Years	Team	Apps	(Gls)
2018–2022	North Carolina Tar Heels	86	(10)

Senior career*
Years	Team	Apps	(Gls)
2016	Albuquerque Sol	2	(0)
2017	Colorado Rapids U23	6	(0)
2022	South Georgia Tormenta 2	0	(0)
2022	Tennessee SC	3	(0)
2023	New Mexico United	8	(0)
2024–2025	Chattanooga FC	0	(0)
- * Club domestic league appearances and goals as of January 3, 2024

Milo Garvanian (born January 17, 2000) is an American soccer player.

== Career ==
=== Youth ===
Garvanian was born in Albuquerque, New Mexico and played with the Rio Rapids SC and played two games for USL PDL side Albuquerque Sol in 2016, but later moved to Denver, Colorado, where he attended George Washington High School. While at high school, Garvanian played club soccer with the Colorado Rapids academy. In 2017, Garvanian played with the side's U16 team, scoring two goals in 16 regular season games, and also appeared eight times for the U18 team and six times with the USL PDL side Colorado Rapids U-23. During this season, he captained the U16 side and helped them to reach the 2017 National Semi-Finals in the Academy Playoffs, earning him a nomination to the Academy Central Conference Best XI .

=== College and amateur ===
In 2018, Garvanian committed to the University of North Carolina at Chapel Hill to play college soccer. In five seasons with the Tar Heels, he made 86 appearances, scoring ten goals and tallying eleven assists. In his final season, Garvanian was named United Soccer Coaches All-South Region Third Team and All-ACC Second Team.

During the 2022 season, Garvanian joined USL League Two side South Georgia Tormenta 2, but never made a first-team appearance. In the same season, he appeared three times with League Two's Tennessee SC.

=== Professional ===
On December 22, 2022, Garvanian was selected 54th overall in the 2023 MLS SuperDraft by CF Montréal. However, he didn't sign with the club. On April 4, 2023, it was announced Garvanian had signed with USL Championship side New Mexico United on a one-year contract.

== Personal life ==
Born in the United States, Garvanian is of Armenian descent.
