= Anatolie Prepeliță =

Moldovan footballer

Personal information
- Date of birth: 6 August 1997 (age 29)
- Place of birth: Chișinău, Moldova
- Height: 1.93 m (6 ft 4 in)
- Position: Defender

Youth career
- Zimbru Chișinău

Senior career*
Years	Team	Apps	(Gls)
2015–2017	Zimbru-2 Chișinău	24	(3)
2016–2019	Zimbru Chișinău	64	(2)
2020–2022	Spartaks Jūrmala	13	(0)
2021	→ Sfîntul Gheorghe (loan)	7	(1)
2022	Bălți	10	(1)
2023–2024	Chattanooga FC	43	(2)
2025	Tormenta FC	4	(0)

International career^{‡}
2017–2018	Moldova U21 (Note: Only official UEFA matches included)	1	(0)
2019–	Moldova	4	(0)
- * Club domestic league appearances and goals as of 1 November 2025 ‡ National team caps and goals as of 9 January 2020

Anatolie Prepeliță (born 6 August 1997) is a Moldovan professional footballer who plays for the Moldova national team, as a defender.

== Club career ==
Prepeliță made his professional debut for Zimbru in the Divizia Națională on 29 April 2016 against Speranța Nisporeni, coming on as a 93rd-minute substitute in a 1–0 win.

Prepeliță signed with USL League One side Tormenta FC on 10 January 2025.

== International career ==
He made his Moldova national football team debut on 11 October 2019 in a Euro 2020 qualifier against Andorra. He started the game and played the whole match as Moldova lost 0–1.
