= Alex McGrath =

English footballer and cricketer (born 1997)

Personal information
- Date of birth: 12 May 1997 (age 29)
- Place of birth: Spennymoor, England
- Height: 1.75 m (5 ft 9 in)
- Position: Midfielder

Team information
- Current team: Chattanooga FC
- Number: 33

Youth career
- –2015: Whitworth Park
- 2015–2018: Team Durham

College career
Years	Team	Apps	(Gls)
2018–2019	Appalachian State	35	(0)

Senior career*
Years	Team	Apps	(Gls)
2021–2022	Stumptown AC	18	(3)
2022–	Chattanooga FC	79	(18)
- * Club domestic league appearances and goals as of 21 August 2025

Alex Halliday McGrath (born 12 May 1997) is an English footballer and former cricketer who currently plays for and captains Chattanooga FC in MLS Next Pro.

== Cricket ==
McGrath made his first-class debut on 28 March 2017 for Durham MCCU against Gloucestershire as part of the Marylebone Cricket Club University fixtures.

== University football ==
McGrath played soccer with Durham University. After graduating he relocated to the United States in 2018 to play for Appalachian State in Boone, North Carolina. With the Mountaineers, he made 35 appearances. In 2018, he was named in the second-team all-Sun Belt, helping the Mountaineers earn their first winning season since the 2012 campaign and posted a top-three finish in the Sun Belt. McGrath was then selected as team captain for 2019 and was again named in the second team All-Sun Belt. He graduated with an MSc in Exercise Science.

== Chattanooga FC ==
In the 2025 season, McGrath started for and captained Chattanooga FC in its first four matches. He provided an assist in the team's first league match and totaled 262 minutes in league play, while also playing all 120 minutes in the victory after extra time over Corpus Christi FC in the first round of the 2025 U.S. Open Cup. However, he then missed most of the 2025 MLS Next Pro Season due to a knee injury he suffered in the latter stages of a match against Atlanta United 2 on March 30, 2025.

== Personal life ==
McGrath is the son of Ian and Elaine McGrath. He enjoys playing cricket and golf, and works as a DJ in his spare time.
