= 2026 Huntsville City FC season =

Huntsville City FC
2026 season
- Owner: Nashville SC
- Head coach: Chris O'Neal
- Stadium: Joe Davis Stadium
- MLS Next Pro: Eastern Conference: Overall:
- Top goalscorer: League: (United States) Maximus Ekk (6 Goals); All: (Ghana) Maximus Ekk (6 Goals)
- Highest home attendance: 3,654 vs Chattanooga FC March 21
- Lowest home attendance: 3,654 vs Chattanooga FC March 21
- Average home league attendance: 3,654
- Biggest win: Huntsville City FC 4–0 FC Cincinnati 2 May 13
- Biggest defeat: Crown Legacy FC 7–2 Huntsville City FC March 6
Home colors	Away colors

The 2026 Huntsville City FC season will be the fourth season of Huntsville City FC, a soccer team based in Huntsville, Alabama, United States. It will be their fourth season competing in MLS Next Pro, a professional developmental league in the third tier of the United States soccer pyramid. The club serves as a development and reserve squad for Nashville SC of Major League Soccer.

== Staff ==
Coaching & Technical Staff
Director of Soccer Operations	(England) Matt Cairns
Head coach	(United States) Chris O'Neal
Assistant coach	(Palestine) Omar Jarun
Assistant coach	(United States) Alex Kuehl
Goalkeeping coach	Vacant
Head Athletic Trainer	(United States) Luis Rodas
Performance Coach & Sports Scientist	(United States) Josh Stewart
Video Analyst/Scouting	(Brazil) Matt Bautista
Head Equipment Manager	(United States) Sam Gibson

== Roster ==
As of July 24, 2026

No.	Pos.	Nation	Player
2	DF	JAM	Malachi Molina
3	DF	USA	Gabriel Alonso
4	MF	GHA	Patrick Amarh
5	DF	USA	Abdel Talabi
6	MF	CAN	Charles-Émile Brunet
8	MF	PAN	Moisés Véliz
9	FW	NGR	Light Eke
10	FW	USA	Maximus Ekk
11	MF	USA	Jayvin Van Deventer
12	DF	JAM	Nigel Prince
13	GK	DOM	Xavier Valdez
14	MF	USA	Angel Iniguez
15	FW	USA	Alioune Ka
17	DF	CAN	Jordan Knight
18	FW	USA	Nicklaus Sullivan
19	FW	USA	Isaiah LeFlore
20	MF	ECU	Matteo Zambrano
21	DF	FRA	Kessy Coulibaly
22	DF	USA	Thomas Williams
23	FW	GHA	Shak Mohammed
24	MF	USA	Nick Pariano
26	FW	CHI	Zidane Yáñez
28	DF	USA	Zach Barrett
29	MF	USA	Julian Gaines
33	DF	USA	Christian Applewhite
40	DF	USA	Andre Krikorian
44	DF	USA	Isac Enriquez
45	DF	USA	Liam Devan
47	DF	USA	William Stribling
55	MF	USA	Ari Saliu
66	DF	USA	Brooks Hilger
70	MF	JPN	Misei Yoshizawa
73	FW	JAM	Fabian Reynolds
77	FW	USA	Xavier Aguilar
80	FW	USA	David Salukombo
88	FW	ANT	Aiden Jarvis
89	DF	USA	Leo Christiano
94	GK	USA	Eamon Schorzman
96	GK	USA	Will Mackay
97	GK	USA	Emmanuel Arias
99	FW	USA	Joshua Swanzy

Nashville SC first team player.
Signed to Nashville SC Academy contract.

== Transfers ==
=== In ===
Date	Position	Number	Name	from	Type	Fee	Ref.
February 20, 2026	MF	8	(Panama) Moisés Véliz	(Panama) Tauro FC	Loan	Free	
February 20, 2026	FW	22	(United States) Maximus Ekk	(United States) Nashville SC	Signing	Free	
February 20, 2026	DF	29	(United States) Julian Gaines	(United States) Nashville SC	Signing	Free	
February 25, 2026	FW	18	(United States) Nicklaus Sullivan	(United States) Ventura County FC	Signing	Free	
February 25, 2026	DF	89	(United States) Leo Christiano	(United States) Sporting KC II	Signing	Free	
February 25, 2026	DF	12	(Jamaica) Nigel Prince	(United States) Northwestern Wildcats	Signing	Free	
February 25, 2026	MF	24	(United States) Nick Pariano	(United States) Philadelphia Union II	Signing	Free	
March 2, 2026	MF	14	(United States) Angel Iniguez	(United States) San Jose State Spartans	Signing	Free	
March 2, 2026	MF	11	(United States) Jayvin Van Deventer	(United States) Northwestern Wildcats	Signing	Free	
March 2, 2026	GK	96	(United States) Will Mackay	(United States) Real Monarchs	Signing	Free	
March 2, 2026	FW	9	(Nigeria) Light Eke	(Nigeria) Collins Edwin SC	Signing	Free	
March 26, 2026	FW	73	(Jamaica) Fabian Reynolds	(England) Wolverhampton Wanderers U20s	Signing	Free	
March 26, 2026	MF	70	(Japan) Misei Yoshizawa	(United States) Clemson Tigers	Signing	Free	
March 26, 2026	MF	20	(Ecuador) Matteo Zambrano	(United States) Real Monarchs	Signing	Free	
May 7, 2026	DF	5	(United States) Abdel Talabi	(United States) Monterey Bay FC	Loan	Free	
May 22, 2026	FW	26	(Chile) Zidane Yáñez	(United States) New York City FC	Loan	Free	
May 22, 2026	FW	88	(Antigua and Barbuda) Aiden Jarvis	(United States) New York Red Bulls	Loan	Free	
July 24, 2026	DF	27	(Ecuador) Maikel Caicedo	(Ecuador) LDU Quito	Transfer	Free	
September 9, 2026	MF		(United States) Landry Walker	(United States) Austin FC	Hybrid Deal	Free	

=== Out ===
Date	Position	No.	Name	To	Type	Fee	Ref.
November 15, 2025	MF	8	(Panama) Moises Veliz	(Panama) Tauro FC (United States) Nashville SC	Loan Expired then rejoined	NA	
November 15, 2025	FW	15	(Grenada) Damien Barker John	(United States) Chattanooga FC	Option Declined	NA	
November 15, 2025	DF	20	(United States) Kevin Carmichael	(United States) Forward Madison FC	Option Declined	NA	
November 15, 2025	DF	2	(United States) Blake Bowen	(United States) Corpus Christi FC	Option Declined	NA	
November 15, 2025	DF	12	(United States) Tyshawn Rose	(United States) Sporting JAX	Option Declined	NA	
November 15, 2025	MF	10	(France) Christian Koffi	(United States) New York Cosmos	Option Declined	NA	
November 15, 2025	MF	6	(Spain) Pep Casas	(United States) Sacramento Republic FC	Option Declined	NA	
November 15, 2025	MF	13	(United States) Bryce Boneau	(Canada) Toronto FC II	Option Declined	NA	
November 15, 2025	FW	11	(Trinidad and Tobago) Real Gill	(United States) One Knoxville SC	Option Declined	NA	
November 15, 2025	GK	1	(United States) Erik Lauta	(United States) Austin FC II	Option Declined	NA	
November 15, 2025	MF	66	(Kenya) Philip Mayaka	(United States) Athletic Club Boise	Out of Contract	Free	
December 2, 2025	MF	7	(Republic of Ireland) Ethan O'Brien	(Republic of Ireland) Drogheda United	Option Declined	NA	
December 3, 2025	MF	30	(United States) Alan Carleton	(Sweden) Sandvikens IF	Transfer	Undisclosed	
December 10, 2025	FW	9	(United States) Gio Miglietti	(United States) FC Naples	Option Declined	NA	
January 6, 2026	FW	16	(Cayman Islands) Gunnar Studenhofft	(United States) Phoenix Rising FC	Transfer	NA	

== Non-competitive fixtures ==
=== Preseason ===
February 21	Huntsville City FC	v	UAB Blazers	Huntsville, Alabama
2:00 PM CT				Stadium: Wicks Family Field at Joe Davis Stadium

March 28	Huntsville City FC	v	UAH Chargers	Huntsville, Alabama
12:00 PM CT				Stadium: Wicks Family Field at Joe Davis Stadium

== MLS Next Pro ==
=== Regular Season ===
March 2 1	Orlando City B	1–3	Huntsville City FC	Kissimmee, Florida
7:00 PM EDT	Sarajian 45+3'; Taifi (yellow card) 49'; Caraballo (yellow card) 60'	Report	Alonso (yellow card) 14'; Applewhite (yellow card) 21'; Mohammed 28', 62'; Knight 33' (yellow card) 49'; Pariano (yellow card) 84'	Stadium: Osceola Heritage Park; Referee: Elvis Osmanovic

March 6 2	Crown Legacy FC	7–2	Huntsville City FC	Matthews, North Carolina
7:00 PM EDT	Mbongue 3'; Aloko 15', 19'; Berchimas 43'; Sangoquiza (yellow card) 45+2'; Richmond 45+5'; Coulibaly 53'; Kamden (yellow card) 61'; Ouedraogo 68'; Cleary 81'	Report	Inguez 27'; Pariano (yellow card) 30'; Ekk 45+3' (pen.); Véliz (yellow card) 90+2'	Stadium: Sportsplex at Matthews; Referee: Jorge Escobar

March 15 3	Atlanta United 2	4–1	Huntsville City FC	Athens, Georgia
7:00 PM EDT	Butts 26', 62'; Dunbar (yellow card) 42'; Brennan 57'; Pita (yellow card) 64'; Senanou (yellow card) 78'; Dovlo 86'	Report	Christiano 14'; Prince (yellow card) 54'; Véliz (yellow card) 56'; Brunet (yellow card) 80'	Stadium: Turner Soccer Complex; Referee: Corbyn May

March 21 4	Huntsville City FC	2–2 (4–2 p)	Chattanooga FC	Huntsville, Alabama
8:00 PM EDT	Mohammed 15'; Ekk 37'	Report	Sar-Sar (yellow card) 43'; Krehl 45+1'; Robertson 77' (pen.); Jones (yellow card) 90+3'	Stadium: Wicks Family Field at Joe Davis Stadium; Attendance: 3,654; Referee: Braeden Frey
	Penalties
	Brunet (penalty scored); Coulibaly (penalty scored); Sullivan (penalty scored); Mohammed (penalty scored)		(penalty missed) Robertson; (penalty scored) Mangarov; (penalty scored) Jones; (penalty missed) McGrath

April 11 5	Huntsville City FC	0–0 (2–4 p)	Chicago Fire FC II	Huntsville, Alabama
8:00 PM EDT	Coulibaly (yellow card) 21'; Véliz (yellow card) 64'	Report	Pineda (yellow card) 38'; Villanueva (yellow card) 71'; Pratt (yellow card) 84'	Stadium: Wicks Family Field at Joe Davis Stadium; Referee: Drew Klemp
	Penalties
	Ekk (penalty scored); Yoshizawa (penalty missed); Pariano (penalty scored); Gaines (penalty missed)		(penalty missed) Borso; (penalty scored) Pineda; (penalty scored) Sandmeyer; (penalty scored) Diawara; (penalty scored) Napoe

April 18 6	Inter Miami CF II	2–4	Huntsville City FC	Fort Lauderdale, Florida
7:00 PM EDT	Saja 41'; Convers (yellow card) 45'; Plambeck (yellow card) 64'; Zeltzer-Zubida 78'	Report	Aguilar 19'; Ekk 47'; Knight 49'; Eke (yellow card) 53' (goal) 72'; Gaines (yellow card) 90+4'	Stadium: Chase Stadium; Referee: Stefan Perri

May 2 7	Chattanooga FC	0–2	Huntsville City FC	Chattanooga, Tennessee
7:00 PM EDT	Koehler (yellow card) 67'	Report	Yoshizawa 47'; Prince (yellow card) 56'; Pariano (yellow card) 87'; Reynolds (yellow card) 90'; Molina 90+4'; Mackay (yellow card) 90+7'; Van Deventer (yellow card) 90+7'	Stadium: Finley Stadium; Attendance: 3,224; Referee: Stephen Foster

May 7 8	Huntsville City FC	3–0	Carolina Core FC	Huntsville, Alabama
8:00 PM EDT	Ekk 28'; Sullivan 79'; Véliz 90+3'	Report	Evers (yellow card) 23' (yellow-red card) 57'; Diakite (yellow card) 32'	Stadium: Wicks Family Field at Joe Davis Stadium; Referee: Amin Hadzic

May 13 9	Huntsville City FC	4–0	FC Cincinnati 2	Huntsville, Alabama
8:00 PM EDT	Ekk 14', 71'; Yoshizawa (yellow card) 23'; Christiano 57'; Molina 75'; Véliz (yellow card) 81'	Report	Lachekar (yellow card) 51'; Schlotterbeck (yellow card) 78'; Chirilă (yellow card) 90+2'	Stadium: Wicks Family Field at Joe Davis Stadium; Referee: Lauren Aldrich

May 16 10	Huntsville City FC	2–6	Atlanta United 2	Huntsville, Alabama
8:00 PM EDT	Christiano 18' (yellow card) 77'; Ekk (yellow card) 31' (yellow-red card); Gaines 45+1'; Pariano (yellow card) 64'; Véliz (yellow card) 79' (yellow-red card) 80'	Report	Kovac 53', 66', 76', 90+5', 90+8'; Butts (yellow card) 62' (goal) 90+4'; Dunbar (yellow card) 72'	Stadium: Wicks Family Field at Joe Davis Stadium; Referee: Corbin Goodyear

May 23 11	Chicago Fire FC II	4–0	Huntsville City FC	Bridgeview, Illinois
4:00 PM EDT	Turdean 14'; Hyte 30' (yellow card) 53'; Boltz 40'; Diawara 90+1' (pen.)	Report	Gaines (yellow card) 37'; Iniguez (yellow card) 77'; Prince (yellow card) 90'	Stadium: SeatGeek Stadium; Referee: Ryan Homik

May 30 12	Huntsville City FC	2–2 (0–3 p)	CT United FC	Huntsville, Alabama
8:00 PM EDT	Véliz (yellow card) 22'; Ekk 44'; Molina 78'	Report	Monis 8'; Applewhaite (yellow card) 19'; Lacy (yellow card) 27'; Mora (yellow card) 27'; D’Ippolito 67'	Stadium: Wicks Family Field at Joe Davis Stadium; Referee: Laith Dahhan
	Penalties
	Inguez (penalty missed); Jarvis (penalty missed); Pariano (penalty missed)		(penalty scored) Applewhaite; (penalty missed) Lacy; (penalty scored) Kamrath; (penalty scored) Monis

June 5 13	Toronto FC II	2–1	Huntsville City FC	North York, Toronto, Ontario
7:00 PM EDT	Fisher 16'; Bossenberry 40' (yellow card) 59'; Nakhly (yellow card) 90+6'	Report	Gaines (yellow card) 85'; Ekk 90+3'	Stadium: York Lions Stadium; Referee: Nicolas Melita

June 13 14	Huntsville City FC	1–2	Orlando City B	Huntsville, Alabama
8:00 PM EDT	Stribling (yellow card) 19'; Gaines 45+1'; Christiano (yellow card) 90+4'	Report	Sarajian (yellow card) 21'; Trombino (yellow card) 34'; Belgodere 50'; Ramírez 77'	Stadium: Wicks Family Field at Joe Davis Stadium; Referee: Salvador Flores

June 20 15	Huntsville City FC	P–P	Crown Legacy FC	Huntsville, Alabama
8:00 PM EDT				Stadium: Wicks Family Field at Joe Davis Stadium

June 28 16	Carolina Core FC	1–0	Huntsville City FC	High Point, North Carolina
6:00 PM EDT	Raimbault 44'	Report	Coulibaly (yellow card) 26'; Devan (yellow card) 71'	Stadium: Truist Point; Referee: JC Griggs

July 5 17	Huntsville City FC	2–2 (3–2 p)	Chicago Fire FC II	Huntsville, Alabama
8:00 PM EDT	Yoshizawa 24'; Iniguez 60'	Report	Villanueva 31'; Nigg 48'; Turdean (yellow card) 90+1'	Stadium: Wicks Family Field at Joe Davis Stadium; Referee: Anthony Sobolevsky
	Penalties
	Sullivan (penalty scored); Ekk (penalty missed); Véliz (penalty scored); Mackay (penalty missed)		(penalty scored) Fleming; (penalty missed) Nigg; (penalty scored) Villanueva; (penalty missed) Pineda; (penalty missed) Napoe

July 12 18	Philadelphia Union II	0–0 (5–3 p)	Huntsville City FC	Chester, Pennsylvania
3:00 PM EDT	Mendoza (yellow card) 41'; Sequera (yellow card) 47'	Report	Molina (yellow card) 90'	Stadium: Subaru Park; Referee: Nicholas Strednak
	Penalties
	Davis (penalty scored); Uzcátegui (penalty scored); Gladstone (penalty scored); Marks (penalty scored); Craig (penalty scored)		(penalty scored) Sullivan; (penalty scored) Yáñez; (penalty scored) Véliz; (penalty missed) Jarvis

July 18 19	Huntsville City FC	2–0	Atlanta United 2	Huntsville, Alabama
8:54 PM EDT	Véliz (yellow card) 42'; Ekk 53'; Molina 70'; Sullivan (yellow card) 90'	Report	Jardines (yellow card) 29'; Chica (yellow card) 90+7'; Senanou (red card) 90+7'	Stadium: Wicks Family Field at Joe Davis Stadium; Referee: Alejo Calume
Note: match was delayed due to rain

July 26 20	Orlando City B	0–1	Huntsville City FC	Kissimmee, Florida
7:00 PM EDT	Leão (yellow card) 6'	Report	Yáñez 64'; Brunet (yellow card) 79'	Stadium: Osceola Heritage Park; Referee: Carlos Rodriguez

August 1 21	Huntsville City FC	1–3	Crown Legacy FC	Huntsville, Alabama
8:32 PM EDT	Yáñez 45+1' (yellow card) 58'; Véliz (red card) 81'; Zambrano (yellow card) 86'	Report	Subotić 12' (yellow card) 35'; Richmond (yellow card) 45+3'; Neeley (yellow card) 63'; Mbongue 66', 78'	Stadium: Wicks Family Field at Joe Davis Stadium; Referee: Jacob Larson

August 8 22	Carolina Core FC	2–0	Huntsville City FC	High Point, North Carolina
6:21 PM CDT	Orbaugh 5' (yellow card) 33'; Raimbault 44'; Kaloikian (yellow card) 90+1'	Report	Caicedo (yellow card) 11'; Prince (yellow card) 78' (yellow-red card) 90'	Stadium: Truist Point; Referee: Dorian Del Toro

August 12 15	Huntsville City FC	2–2 (4–5 p)	Crown Legacy FC	Huntsville, Alabama
8:00 PM EDT	Pariano (yellow card) 5' (goal) 22'; Devan (yellow card) 36'; Caicedo (yellow card) 54'; Véliz 68'; Yáñez (yellow card) 75'; Jarvis (yellow card) 90+1'	Report	Smalls 3', 13'; Gonzalez (yellow card) 30'; Romero (yellow card) 90+2'; Mbongue (yellow card) 90+6'	Stadium: Wicks Family Field at Joe Davis Stadium; Referee: Jake Joyce
	Penalties
	Coulibaly (penalty missed); Christiano (penalty scored); Véliz (penalty scored); Yáñez (penalty scored); Iniguez (penalty scored); Aguilar (penalty missed)		(penalty scored) Richmond; (penalty scored) Mbongue; (penalty missed) Ventura; (penalty scored) Holt; (penalty scored) Smith; (penalty scored) Mcdowell

August 16 23	Huntsville City FC	2–0	Inter Miami CF II	Huntsville, Alabama
7:00 PM EDT	Aguilar (yellow card) 39'; Gaines (yellow card) 55'; Molina 89', 90+7'; Devan (yellow card) 90'	Report	Acevedo (yellow card) 8'; Hall (yellow card) 52'; Saja (yellow card) 54'; Urkidi (yellow card) 73'; Dearmin (yellow card) 74'	Stadium: Wicks Family Field at Joe Davis Stadium; Referee: MJ Tehini

August 23 24	Huntsville City FC	1–0	Columbus Crew 2	Huntsville, Alabama
7:00 PM EDT	Knight (yellow card) 20'; Molina 90+7' (yellow card) 90+7'	Report	Di Noto (yellow card) 58'; Aoki (yellow card) 90+4'	Stadium: Wicks Family Field at Joe Davis Stadium; Referee: Marie Durr

August 30 25	New England Revolution II	1–4	Huntsville City FC	Smithfield, Rhode Island
7:00 PM EDT	Zambrano 6' (yellow card) 29'; Azar (yellow card) 49'; Morgan (yellow card) 76'	Report	Yáñez (yellow card) 12' (goal) 24', 66'; Knight 48'; Caicedo (yellow card) 64'; LeFlore (yellow card) 79'; Brunet 88'	Stadium: Beirne Stadium; Referee: Promise Adebayo-Ige

September 9 26	Huntsville City FC	1–2	Chattanooga FC	Huntsville, Alabama
8:00 PM EDT	Yáñez 29' (pen.) (yellow card) 44'; Knight (yellow card) 40'; Williams (yellow card) 53'	Report	Jones (yellow card) 28' (goal) 55'; Arrúa 42'	Stadium: Wicks Family Field at Joe Davis Stadium; Referee: Elvis Osmanovic

September 13 27	Inter Miami CF II	1–4	Huntsville City FC	Fort Lauderdale, Florida
7:00 PM EDT	DePaula (yellow card) 4'; Zeltzer-Zubida (yellow card) 24'; Jamhour 82'	Report	Yáñez 14', 25'; Knight 37'; Molina 88'	Stadium: Chase Stadium; Referee: Jordan Gray

September 20 28	New York Red Bulls II	1–2	Huntsville City FC	Montclair, New Jersey
2:00 PM EDT	Kone (yellow card) 5'; Rodriguez (yellow card) 39'; Mosquera (yellow card) 57'; Castro 90'	Report	Véliz (yellow card) 45'; Yáñez 48'; Gaines (yellow card) 80'; Molina 81'; Williams (yellow card) 89'	Stadium: MSU Soccer Park; Referee: Stephen Foster

==== Playoffs ====
October 11 Wild Card Round	New York Red Bulls II	3–1	Huntsville City FC	Montclair, New Jersey
5:00 PM ET	Jiménez 43'; Castro 45'; Rodriguez (yellow card) 76'; Dieujuste (yellow card) 80'; Rosborough 89'	Report	Yáñez 6'; Knight (yellow card) 25'; Barrett (yellow card) 53'; LeFlore (yellow card) 61'	Stadium: MSU Soccer Park; Referee: Elvis Osmanovic

== Stats ==
=== Appearances and goals ===
No.	Pos	Nat	Player	Total		MLS Next Pro		MLSNP Playoffs	
No.	Pos	Nat	Player	Apps	Goals	Apps	Goals	Apps	Goals
2	MF	(Jamaica) JAM	Malachi Molina	28	9	16+11	9	0+1	0
3	DF	(United States) USA	Gabriel Alonso	6	0	5+1	0	0+0	0
4	MF	(Ghana) GHA	Patrick Amarh	1	0	0+1	0	0+0	0
5	DF	(United States) USA	Abdel Talabi	6	0	6+0	0	0+0	0
6	MF	(Canada) CAN	Charles-Émile Brunet	8	1	8+0	1	0+0	0
7	FW	(United States) USA	Alioune Ka	3	0	0+3	0	0+0	0
8	MF	(Panama) PAN	Moisés Véliz	25	2	22+2	2	1+0	0
9	FW	(Nigeria) NGR	Light Eke	7	1	3+4	1	0+0	0
10	FW	(United States) USA	Maximus Ekk	26	9	18+7	9	0+1	0
11	MF	(United States) USA	Jayvin Van Deventer	19	0	8+11	0	0+0	0
12	DF	(Jamaica) JAM	Nigel Prince	18	0	12+6	0	0+0	0
13	GK	(Dominican Republic) DOM	Xavier Valdez	7	0	7+0	0	0+0	0
14	MF	(United States) USA	Angel Iniguez	17	2	7+10	2	0+0	0
15	DF	(United States) USA	Owen Presthus	3	0	3+0	0	0+0	0
16	MF	(United States) USA	Landry Walker	3	0	1+1	0	1+0	0
17	FW	(Canada) CAN	Jordan Knight	11	4	10+0	4	1+0	0
18	FW	(United States) USA	Nicklaus Sullivan	21	1	8+13	1	0+0	0
19	DF	(United States) USA	Isaiah LeFlore	8	0	7+0	0	1+0	0
20	MF	(Ecuador) ECU	Matteo Zambrano	5	0	2+3	0	0+0	0
21	DF	(France) FRA	Kessy Coulibaly	13	0	7+6	0	0+0	0
22	DF	(United States) USA	Thomas Williams	11	0	10+0	0	1+0	0
23	FW	(Ghana) GHA	Shak Mohammed	3	3	3+0	3	0+0	0
24	MF	(United States) USA	Nick Pariano	26	1	19+6	1	0+1	0
26	FW	(Chile) CHI	Zidane Yáñez	13	9	8+4	8	1+0	1
27	DF	(Ecuador) ECU	Maikel Caicedo	10	0	8+1	0	1+0	0
28	DF	(United States) USA	Zach Barrett	4	0	2+1	0	0+1	0
29	MF	(United States) USA	Julian Gaines	21	2	16+4	2	1+0	0
31	DF	(United States) USA	Reed Baker-Whiting	1	0	1+0	0	0+0	0
33	DF	(United States) USA	Christian Applewhite	1	0	1+0	0	0+0	0
40	MF	(United States) USA	Andre Krikorian	3	0	1+2	0	0+0	0
44	DF	(United States) USA	Isac Enriquez	0	0	0+0	0	0+0	0
45	DF	(United States) USA	Liam Devan	6	0	2+4	0	0+0	0
47	FW	(United States) USA	William Stribling	8	0	4+4	0	0+0	0
55	MF	(United States) USA	Ari Saliu	0	0	0+0	0	0+0	0
66	DF	(United States) USA	Brooks Hilger	1	0	0+1	0	0+0	0
70	MF	(Japan) JPN	Misei Yoshizawa	16	2	12+3	2	1+0	0
73	FW	(Jamaica) JAM	Fabian Reynolds	7	0	2+5	0	0+0	0
77	FW	(United States) USA	Xavier Aguilar	23	1	16+6	1	1+0	0
80	FW	(United States) USA	David Salukombo	2	0	0+2	0	0+0	0
88	FW	(Antigua and Barbuda) ANT	Aiden Jarvis	13	0	12+1	0	0+0	0
89	DF	(United States) USA	Leo Christiano	24	3	19+4	3	0+1	0
94	GK	(United States) USA	Eamon Schorzman	0	0	0+0	0	0+0	0
95	GK	(United States) USA	Will Mackay	22	0	21+0	0	1+0	0
97	GK	(United States) USA	Emmanuel Arias	0	0	0+0	0	0+0	0
99	FW	(United States) USA	Joshua Swanzy	5	0	2+3	0	0+0	0

- Last updated: October 11, 2026

=== Top scorers ===
Rank	Position	Number	Name	MLS Next Pro	MLSNP Playoffs	Total
1	MF	2	(Jamaica) Malachi Molina	9	0	9
1	FW	10	(United States) Maximus Ekk	9	0	9
1	FW	26	(Chile) Zidane Yáñez	8	1	9
4	FW	17	(Canada) Jordan Knight	4	0	4
5	FW	23	(Ghana) Shak Mohammed	3	0	3
5	DF	89	(United States) Leo Christiano	3	0	3
7	MF	8	(Panama) Moisés Véliz	2	0	2
7	MF	14	(United States) Angel Iniguez	2	0	2
7	MF	18	(United States) Julian Gaines	2	0	2
7	MF	70	(Japan) Misei Yoshizawa	2	0	2
11	MF	6	(Canada) Charles-Émile Brunet	1	0	1
11	FW	9	(Nigeria) Light Eke	1	0	1
11	FW	18	(United States) Nicklaus Sullivan	1	0	1
11	MF	24	(United States) Nick Pariano	1	0	1
11	FW	77	(United States) Xavier Aguilar	1	0	1
Total				49	1	50

- Last updated: October 11, 2026

=== Top assists ===
Rank	Position	Number	Name	MLS Next Pro	MLSNP Playoffs	Total
1	MF	6	(Canada) Charles-Émile Brunet	4	0	4
1	MF	70	(Japan) Misei Yoshizawa	4	0	4
1	MF	8	(Panama) Moisés Véliz	3	1	4
4	MF	2	(Jamaica) Malachi Molina	3	0	3
4	FW	17	(Canada) Jordan Knight	3	0	3
6	FW	10	(United States) Maximus Ekk	2	0	2
6	MF	12	(United States) Angel Iniguez	2	0	2
6	MF	18	(United States) Nicklaus Sullivan	2	0	2
6	DF	22	(United States) Thomas Williams	2	0	2
6	MF	24	(United States) Nick Pariano	2	0	2
6	FW	26	(Chile) Zidane Yáñez	2	0	2
12	DF	12	(Jamaica) Nigel Prince	1	0	1
12	GK	13	(Dominican Republic) Xavier Valdez	1	0	1
12	DF	27	(Ecuador) Maikel Caicedo	1	0	1
12	MF	29	(United States) Julian Gaines	1	0	1
12	FW	73	(Jamaica) Fabian Reynolds	1	0	1
12	DF	88	(Antigua and Barbuda) Aidan Jarvis	1	0	1
12	DF	89	(United States) Leo Christiano	1	0	1
Total				36	1	37

- Last updated: October 11, 2026

=== Disciplinary record ===
No.	Pos.	Player	MLS Next Pro			MLSNP Playoffs			Total		
No.	Pos.	Player	Yellow card	(yellow card) (yellow-red card)	Red card	Yellow card	(yellow card) (yellow-red card)	Red card	Yellow card	(yellow card) (yellow-red card)	Red card
2	DF	(Jamaica) Malachi Molina	2	0	0	0	0	0	2	0	0
3	DF	(United States) Gabriel Alonso	1	0	0	0	0	0	1	0	0
4	MF	(Ghana) Patrick Amarh	0	0	0	0	0	0	0	0	0
5	DF	(United States) Abdel Talabi	0	0	0	0	0	0	0	0	0
6	MF	(Canada) Charles-Émile Brunet	2	0	0	0	0	0	2	0	0
8	MF	(Panama) Moisés Véliz	8	1	1	0	0	0	8	1	1
9	FW	(Nigeria) Light Eke	1	0	0	0	0	0	1	0	0
10	FW	(United States) Maximus Ekk	1	1	0	0	0	0	1	1	0
11	MF	(United States) Jayvin Van Deventer	1	0	0	0	0	0	1	0	0
12	DF	(Jamaica) Nigel Prince	4	1	0	0	0	0	4	1	0
13	GK	(Dominican Republic) Xavier Valdez	0	0	0	0	0	0	0	0	0
14	MF	(United States) Angel Iniguez	1	0	0	0	0	0	1	0	0
15	FW	(United States) Alioune Ka	0	0	0	0	0	0	0	0	0
17	MF	(Canada) Jordan Knight	4	0	0	1	0	0	5	0	0
18	FW	(United States) Nicklaus Sullivan	1	0	0	0	0	0	1	0	0
19	DF	(United States) Isaiah LeFlore	1	0	0	1	0	0	2	0	0
20	MF	(Ecuador) Matteo Zambrano	1	0	0	0	0	0	1	0	0
21	DF	(France) Kessy Coulibaly	2	0	0	0	0	0	2	0	0
22	DF	(United States) Thomas Williams	2	0	0	0	0	0	2	0	0
23	FW	(Ghana) Shak Mohammed	0	0	0	0	0	0	0	0	0
24	MF	(United States) Nick Pariano	5	0	0	0	0	0	5	0	0
26	FW	(Chile) Zidane Yáñez	4	0	0	0	0	0	4	0	0
27	MF	(Ecuador) Maikel Caicedo	3	0	0	0	0	0	3	0	0
28	DF	(United States) Zach Barrett	0	0	0	1	0	0	1	0	0
29	DF	(United States) Julian Gaines	5	0	0	0	0	0	5	0	0
33	DF	(United States) Christian Applewhite	1	0	0	0	0	0	1	0	0
44	DF	(United States) Isac Enriquez	0	0	0	0	0	0	0	0	0
45	DF	(United States) Liam Devan	3	0	0	0	0	0	3	0	0
47	MF	(United States) William Stribling	1	0	0	0	0	0	1	0	0
55	MF	(United States) Ari Saliu	0	0	0	0	0	0	0	0	0
70	MF	(Japan) Misei Yoshizawa	1	0	0	0	0	0	1	0	0
73	FW	(Jamaica) Fabian Reynolds	1	0	0	0	0	0	1	0	0
77	FW	(United States) Xavier Aguilar	1	0	0	0	0	0	1	0	0
80	FW	(United States) David Salukombo	0	0	0	0	0	0	0	0	0
88	FW	(Antigua and Barbuda) Aidan Jarvis	1	0	0	0	0	0	1	0	0
89	DF	(United States) Leo Christiano	3	0	0	0	0	0	3	0	0
95	GK	(United States) Will Mackay	1	0	0	0	0	0	1	0	0
97	GK	(United States) Emmanuel Arias	0	0	0	0	0	0	0	0	0
99	FW	(United States) Joshua Swanzy	0	0	0	0	0	0	0	0	0
Total			62	3	1	3	0	0	65	3	1

- Last updated: October 11, 2026

== Awards and honors ==
=== MLS NEXT Pro Player of the Matchweek ===
Week	Player	Ref
29	(Chile) Zidane Yáñez	
