= 2025 Huntsville City FC season =

Huntsville City FC
2025 season
- Owner: Nashville SC
- Head coach: Chris O'Neal
- Stadium: Joe Davis Stadium
- MLS Next Pro: Eastern Conference: 5th Overall:6th
- MLSNext Pro Playoffs: Conference Semifinals
- Top goalscorer: League: Alan Carleton (12 goals); All: Alan Carleton (12 goals)
- Highest home attendance: 4,985 vs Chattanooga FC May 17
- Lowest home attendance: 2,000-2,500 vs Chicago Fire FC II April 20
- Average home league attendance: 3,734 or 3,634 (2 games missing)
- Biggest win: Huntsville City FC 5–0 Chicago Fire FC II April 20
- Biggest defeat: Atlanta United 2 2–0 Huntsville City FC August 30
| Home colors | Away colors |

The 2025 Huntsville City FC season will be the third season of Huntsville City FC, a soccer team based in Huntsville, Alabama, United States. It will be their third season competing in MLS Next Pro, a professional developmental league in the third tier of the United States soccer pyramid. The club serves as a development and reserve squad for Nashville SC of Major League Soccer.

== Staff ==
Coaching & Technical Staff
| Director of Soccer Operations | (England) Matt Cairns |
| Head coach | (United States) Chris O'Neal |
| Assistant coach | (Palestine) Omar Jarun |
| Assistant coach | (United States) Alex Kuehl |
| Goalkeeping coach | Vacant |
| Head Athletic Trainer | (United States) Luis Rodas |
| Performance Coach & Sports Scientist | (United States) Josh Stewart |
| Video Analyst/Scouting | (Brazil) Matt Bautista |
| Head Equipment Manager | (United States) Sam Gibson |

== Roster ==
As of June 19, 2025

| No. | Pos. | Nation | Player |
|---|---|---|---|
| 1 | GK | USA | Erik Lauta |
| 2 | DF | USA | Blake Bowen |
| 4 | MF | GHA | Patrick Amarh |
| 5 | DF | USA | Wyatt Meyer |
| 6 | MF | ESP | Pep Casas |
| 7 | MF | IRL | Ethan O'Brien |
| 8 | MF | PAN | Moisés Véliz |
| 9 | FW | USA | Gio Miglietti |
| 10 | MF | FRA | Christian Koffi |
| 11 | FW | TTO | Real Gill |
| 12 | DF | USA | Tyshawn Rose |
| 13 | GK | DOM | Xavier Valdez |
| 14 | FW | USA | Alioune Ka |
| 15 | MF | GRN | Damien Barker John (on loan from Real Monarchs) |
| 16 | FW | CAY | Gunnar Studenhofft |
| 17 | FW | USA | Malik Henry-Scott (on loan from Lexington SC) |
| 18 | MF | USA | Matthew Corcoran |
| 19 | DF | CAN | Jordan Knight |
| 20 | DF | USA | Kevin Carmichael |
| 21 | DF | FRA | Kessy Coulibaly |
| 24 | MF | HON | Bryan Acosta |
| 28 | DF | USA | Zach Barrett |
| 30 | MF | USA | Alan Carleton |
| 33 | DF | USA | Christian Applewhite |
| 44 | DF | USA | Gabriel Alonso |
| 47 | FW | SLE | Isaiah Jones |
| 56 | MF | MEX | Jonathan Pérez |
| 66 | MF | KEN | Philip Mayaka |
| 77 | FW | USA | Adem Sipić |
| 98 | GK | USA | Ammar Delic |
| 99 | GK | USA | Brian Schwake |
| — | MF | USA | Bryce Boneau |

Nashville SC first team player.
Signed to Nashville SC Academy contract.

== Transfers ==
=== In ===
| Date | Position | Number | Name | from | Type | Fee | Ref. |
|---|---|---|---|---|---|---|---|
| November 12, 2024 | MF | 7 | (Republic of Ireland) Ethan O'Brien | (United States) Indy Eleven | Transfer | NA | |
| December 5, 2024 | MF | 30 | (United States) Alan Carleton | (United States) Atlanta United 2 | Signing | Free | |
| December 5, 2024 | MF | 8 | (Panama) Moisés Véliz | (Panama) Tauro FC | Signing | Free | |
| December 16, 2024 | FW | 11 | (Trinidad and Tobago) Real Gill | (United States) Northern Colorado Hailstorm FC | Signing | Free | |
| January 14, 2025 | MF | 10 | (France) Christian Koffi | (United States) Chicago Fire FC II | Signing | Free | |
| January 21, 2025 | GK | 1 | (United States) Erik Lauta | (United States) New Hampshire Wildcats | Signing | Free | |
| January 21, 2025 | DF | 12 | (United States) Tyshawn Rose | (United States) North Texas SC | Signing | Free | |
| January 23, 2025 | DF | 2 | (United States) Blake Bowen | (United States) Tacoma Defiance | Signing | Free | |
| February 4, 2025 | FW | 9 | (United States) Gio Miglietti | (United States) Tacoma Defiance | Signing | Free | |
| February 7, 2025 | FW | 17 | (United States) Malik Henry-Scott | (United States) Lexington SC | Loan | | |
| February 12, 2025 | MF | 66 | (Kenya) Philip Mayaka | (United States) Crown Legacy FC | Signing | Free | |
| February 18, 2025 | MF | 98 | (United States) Bryce Boneau | (United States) Notre Dame Fighting Irish | Signing | Free | |
| February 18, 2025 | DF | 20 | (United States) Kevin Carmichael | (United States) California Golden Bears | Signing | Free | |
| February 20, 2025 | DF | 28 | (United States) Zach Barrett | (United States) Vermont Catamounts | Signing | Free | |
| February 20, 2025 | FW | 15 | (Grenada) Damien Barker John | (United States) Real Monarchs | Loan | NA | |
| February 26, 2025 | MF | 6 | (Spain) Pep Casas | (United States) Inter Miami CF II | Signing | NA | |
| March 4, 2025 | FW | 16 | (Cayman Islands) Gunnar Studenhofft | (United States) South Florida Bulls | Signing | NA | |
| June 19, 2025 | FW | 14 | (United States) Alioune Ka | (United States) Cornell Big Red | Signing | NA | |

=== Out ===
| Date | Position | No. | Name | To | Type | Fee | Ref. |
|---|---|---|---|---|---|---|---|
| November 12, 2024 | GK | 39 | (United States) Bryan Dowd | (United States) Chicago Fire FC | Loan Expired | NA | |
| November 12, 2024 | DF | 56 | (United States) Will Perkins | (United States) Union Omaha | Loan Expired | NA | |
| November 12, 2024 | FW | 78 | (Scotland) Tyler Pasnik | (United States) FC Naples | Roster Decisions | NA | |
| November 12, 2024 | DF | 15 | (United States) Joey Akpunonu | (United States) FC Cincinnati II | Loan Expired | NA | |
| November 12, 2024 | DF | 12 | (United States) Dominic Gasso | (United States) Detroit City FC | Loan Expired | NA | |
| November 12, 2024 | FW | 22 | (United States) Maximus Ekk | (United States) Nashville SC | Roster Decisions | NA | |
| November 12, 2024 | DF | 6 | (Spain) Sergi Oriol | (Spain) CF La Nucía | Roster Decisions | NA | |
| November 12, 2024 | FW | | (United States) Makel Rasheed | (United States) South Georgia Tormenta FC | Roster Decisions | NA | |
| November 12, 2024 | GK | 1 | (United States) Simon Jillson | (United States) Chicago Nation | Roster Decisions | NA | |
| November 12, 2024 | DF | 5 | (United States) Joel Sangwa | (United States) NONA FC | Roster Decisions | NA | |
| November 12, 2024 | DF | 3 | (United States) Tomás Ritondale | (United States) FC Naples | Roster Decisions | NA | |
| November 12, 2024 | MF | 38 | (United States) Axel Picazo | | Roster Decisions | NA | |
| November 12, 2024 | MF | 40 | (Kenya) Faiz Opande | (Kenya) Kariobangi Sharks | Roster Decisions | NA | |
| November 12, 2024 | MF | 7 | (United States) Brennan Creek | (United States) Asheville City SC | Roster Decisions | NA | |
| November 12, 2024 | MF | 10 | (England) Ollie Wright | (United States) Portland Hearts of Pine | Roster Decisions | NA | |
| November 12, 2024 | MF | 17 | (United States) Jonathan Bolanos | (United States) Westchester SC | Roster Decisions | NA | |

=== Loan In ===
| No. | Pos. | Player | Loaned from | Start | End | Source |
|---|---|---|---|---|---|---|
| 17 | MF | (United States) Malik Henry-Scott | (United States) Lexington SC | February 4, 2025 | July 10, 2025 | |
| 15 | FW | (Grenada) Damien Barker John | (United States) Real Monarchs | February 20, 2025 | December 31, 2025 | |

== Non-competitive fixtures ==
=== Preseason ===
| January 25 | Huntsville City FC | v | Lindsey Wilson College Blue Raiders | Huntsville, Alabama |
| 2:00 PM CT | | | | Stadium: John Hunt Park |

| February 8 | Huntsville City FC | v | Colorado Rapids 2 | Palm Beach Gardens, Florida |
| 12:00 PM CT |

| February 15 | Austin FC II | v | Huntsville City FC | Austin, Texas |
| 2:00 PM CT | | | | Stadium: Parmer Field |

| February 22 | Huntsville City FC | v | Birmingham Legion | Huntsville, Alabama |
| 2:00 PM CT | | | | Stadium: John Hunt Park |

| February 25 | Huntsville City FC | v | UAH Chargers | Huntsville, Alabama |
| 6:00 PM CT | | | | Stadium: John Hunt Park |

| March 1 | Huntsville City FC | v | Chattanooga Red Wolves SC | Huntsville, Alabama |
| 1:00 PM CT | | | | Stadium: Joe Davis Stadium |

=== Mid-season friendlies ===
| September 3 Space Cowboy Match | Huntsville City FC | 1–6 | Nashville SC | Huntsville, Alabama |
| 7:00 PM CT | Sebhatu 70' | | Bunbury 12', 31'; Qasem 39'; Bowen 45'; Sipić 56'; Mayaka 84' | Stadium: Joe Davis Stadium |

== MLS Next Pro ==
=== Match results ===
| March 9 1 | Chicago Fire FC II | 1–4 | Huntsville City FC | Bridgeview, Illinois |
| 4:00 PM EDT | Fleming III 22'; Osorio (yellow card) 46' (yellow-red card) 78' | Report | Véliz (yellow card) 13'; Koffi 15', 36' (pen.); Reynolds 43' (o.g.); O'Brien (yellow card) 44'; Rose (yellow card) 53'; Studenhofft 85' | Stadium: SeatGeek Stadium; Referee: Atahan Yaya |

| March 15 2 | Chattanooga FC | 1–0 | Huntsville City FC | Chattanooga, Tennessee |
| 7:00 PM EDT | Mangarov 3'; Kwak (yellow card) 40'; Watson (yellow card) 48' | Report | Gaines (yellow card) 35'; Barrett (yellow card) 54' | Stadium: Finley Stadium; Referee: Amin Hadzic |

| March 28 3 | Huntsville City FC | 2–2 (4–3 p) | Philadelphia Union II | Huntsville, Alabama |
| 8:00 PM EDT | Koffi 7' (yellow card) 84'; Studenhofft (yellow card) 64'; Barker John 67' | Report | Uzcátegui (yellow card) 29'; Olivas 45+2'; Sullivan 59'; Anderson (yellow card) 90+3' | Stadium: Wicks Family Field at Joe Davis Stadium; Attendance: 3,512; Referee: Alex Beehler |
| | Penalties |
| | Koffi (penalty scored); Henry-Scott (penalty scored); Carleton (penalty missed); Casas (penalty scored); Bowen (penalty scored) | | (penalty scored) Olivas; (penalty scored) Soria; (penalty missed) Vazquez; (penalty scored) LeBlanc; (penalty missed) Anderson |

| April 13 4 | Crown Legacy FC | 1–1 (3–4 p) | Huntsville City FC | Matthews, North Carolina |
| 7:00 PM EDT | Thomas (yellow card) 7'; Sing (yellow card) 9'; Smith (yellow card) 71' (goal) 76'; John (yellow card) 85'; Sarkos (yellow card) 86' | Report | Koffi 30' (pen.) (yellow card) 55'; Studenhofft (yellow card) 45+4'; Rose (yellow card) 89' | Stadium: Mecklenburg County Sportsplex; Referee: Rogelio Alvarez |
| | Penalties |
| | Neeley (penalty scored); John (penalty scored); Sarkos (penalty missed); Subotić (penalty missed); Smith (penalty scored) | | (penalty missed) Miglietti; (penalty scored) Barrett; (penalty scored) O'Brien; (penalty scored) Gill; (penalty scored) Bowen |

| April 20 5 | Huntsville City FC | 5–0 | Chicago Fire FC II | Huntsville, Alabama |
| 7:00 PM EDT | O'Brien 20' (pen.); Carmichael 38', 45+4'; Studenhofft 45+2' (yellow card) 56'; Sipic 90+2' | Report | Soudan (red card) 23'; Oyegunle (yellow card) 46'; Montiel (yellow card) 55' | Stadium: Wicks Family Field at Joe Davis Stadium; Attendance: 2,000-2,500; Referee: Esad Omanovic |

| April 27 6 | Huntsville City FC | 4–0 | Inter Miami CF II | Huntsville, Alabama |
| 7:00 PM EDT | Bowen 21'; O'Brien 29'; Studenhofft 47'; Knight 86' | Report | Montenegro (yellow card) 12' | Stadium: Wicks Family Field at Joe Davis Stadium; Referee: Rodrigo Albuquerque |

| May 3 7 | Huntsville City FC | 2–2 (4–5 p) | Atlanta United 2 | Huntsville, Alabama |
| 8:00 PM EDT | Knight 20'; Studenhofft (yellow card) 33'; Carleton 42'; Barker John (yellow card) 68'; Gill (yellow card) 75'; Carmichael (yellow card) 81' | Report | Wesseh 45'; Armas (yellow card) 48'; Mazzaferro 61'; Wynne (yellow card) 69' | Stadium: Wicks Family Field at Joe Davis Stadium; Attendance: 3,403; Referee: Kaitlyn Trowbridge |
| | Penalties |
| | Koffi (penalty missed); Gill (penalty scored); O'Brien (penalty scored); Barrett (penalty scored); Bowen (penalty scored) | | (penalty scored) Armas; (penalty scored) Mazzaferro; (penalty scored) Neri; (penalty scored) Tablante; (penalty scored) Sessock |

| May 10 8 | Carolina Core FC | 0–0 (2–3 p) | Huntsville City FC | High Point, North Carolina |
| 7:00 PM EDT | Canete (yellow card) 45'; Rodríguez (yellow card) 64'; Covi (yellow card) 76'; Sumo Jr. (yellow card) 85' | Report | Koffi (yellow card) 37' (red card) 90+2'; O'Brien (yellow card) 63' | Stadium: Truist Point; Attendance: 4,205; Referee: Arman Becan |
| | Penalties |
| | Sutton (penalty missed); Rodríguez (penalty scored); Covi (penalty missed); Bazaes (penalty scored); Canete (penalty missed) | | (penalty scored) Barrett; (penalty scored) Barker John; (penalty missed) O'Brien; (penalty scored) Sipic |

| May 17 9 | Huntsville City FC | 1–2 | Chattanooga FC | Huntsville, Alabama |
| 8:00 PM EDT | Carleton 48'; Valdez (yellow card) 64' | Report | Koehler 63'; James (yellow card) 79'; Mangarov 84'; Ancelin (yellow card) 90+6' | Stadium: Wicks Family Field at Joe Davis Stadium; Attendance: 4,985; Referee: Laith Dahhan |

| May 23 10 | Toronto FC II | 1–2 | Huntsville City FC | North York, Toronto, Ontario |
| 7:00 PM EDT | Fisher (yellow card) 54'; Ayari 68' | Report | Véliz 32'; Carmichael (yellow card) 51'; Koffi 71'; Jones (yellow card) 90+5'; Bowen (yellow card) 90+6' | Stadium: York Lions Stadium; Referee: Melvin Christopher |

| June 6 11 | Huntsville City FC | 2–3 | Orlando City B | Huntsville, Alabama |
| 8:00 PM EDT | Koffi 50'; Mayaka (yellow card) 59'; Studenhofft 70' | Report | Tori (yellow card) 34'; Sargis 48'; Taifi (yellow card) 80'; Solís 84'; Clapier 90+2' (yellow card) 90+3' | Stadium: Wicks Family Field at Joe Davis Stadium; Referee: Gloria Martinez Resendiz |

| June 11 12 | Atlanta United 2 | 0–1 | Huntsville City FC | Athens, Georgia |
| 5:00 PM EDT | Tablante (yellow card) 35'; Majub (yellow card) 90+2' | Report | Koffi 45+1'; Mayaka (yellow card) 50'; Carleton (yellow card) 64'; Lauta (yellow card) 90+1'; Rose (yellow card) 90+5' | Stadium: Turner Soccer Complex; Referee: Kyle Johnston |

| June 20 13 | Huntsville City FC | 3–3 (3–4 p) | Crown Legacy FC | Huntsville, Alabama |
| 8:00 PM EDT | Carleton 19', 71'; Mayaka 22'; Alonso (yellow card) 55'; Rose (yellow card) 69'; Bowen (red card) 90+2' | Report | Subotić 12' (yellow card) 54'; Coulibaly (yellow card) 57'; Sing 61'; Romero 85'; Ouedraogo (yellow card) 90+2'; Holliday (yellow card) during pen shootout' | Stadium: Wicks Family Field at Joe Davis Stadium; Attendance: 4,271; Referee: Muhammad Kaleia |
| | Penalties |
| | Barrett (penalty scored); Carmichael (penalty missed); Carleton (penalty scored); Casas (penalty scored); Ka (penalty missed) | | (penalty scored) Neeley; (penalty scored) Smith; (penalty missed) Berchimas; (penalty scored) Ferreira; (penalty scored) Sing |

| July 6 15 | New York Red Bulls II | 1–2 | Huntsville City FC | Montclair, New Jersey |
| 7:00 PM EDT | Mosquera 26'; Sserwadda (yellow card) 30'; Schwarz (yellow card) 41'; Rojas (yellow card) 55' | Report | Carleton (yellow card) 36' (goal) 83'; Studenhofft 72' (yellow card) 90+6'; Véliz (yellow card) 79' | Stadium: MSU Soccer Park; Referee: Atahan Yaya |

| July 13 16 | FC Cincinnati 2 | 1–0 | Huntsville City FC | Highland Heights, Kentucky |
| 7:00 PM EDT | Ikoba (yellow card) 46'; Jimenez (yellow card) 60'; Daley (yellow card) 84'; Chirilă 86'; Manfroy (yellow card) 90+3' | Report | Studenhofft (yellow card) 45+3'; Casas (yellow card) 60'; Bowen (yellow card) 90+5'; Knight (yellow card) 90+5' | Stadium: NKU Soccer Stadium; Referee: Jeremy Scheer |

| July 18 17 | Huntsville City FC | 2–1 | Columbus Crew 2 | Huntsville, Alabama |
| 8:00 PM EDT | Koffi 56'; Mayaka 81' | Report | Palacios (yellow card) 38' (goal) 84' | Stadium: Wicks Family Field at Joe Davis Stadium; Referee: Wes Caouette |

| July 25 18 | Huntsville City FC | 4–0 | Orlando City B | Huntsville, Alabama |
| 8:00 PM EDT | Knight 31', 43'; Himes 62' (o.g.); Carleton 77' | Report | Sargis (yellow card) 35' | Stadium: Wicks Family Field at Joe Davis Stadium; Referee: Salvador Flores |

| August 3 19 | Crown Legacy FC | 0–4 | Huntsville City FC | Matthews, North Carolina |
| 5:00 PM EDT | Coulibaly (yellow card) 22'; Ouedraogo (red card) 28' | Report | Barrett (yellow card) 27'; Koffi 38', 69'; Alonso (yellow card) 51'; Carleton 60'; O'Brien (yellow card) 64'; Barker John 74'; Véliz (yellow card) 90' | Stadium: Mecklenburg County Sportsplex; Referee: Joe Surgan |

| August 10 20 | Huntsville City FC | 3–2 | Carolina Core FC | Huntsville, Alabama |
| 7:00 PM EDT | Knight 10'; Carleton 19', 26'; Mayaka (yellow card) 45+4'; Barker John (yellow card) 83'; Studenhofft (yellow card) 86'; Barrett (yellow card) 90+7' | Report | Ibarra 50'; Sumo Jr. 69'; Juarez (yellow card) 80' | Stadium: Wicks Family Field at Joe Davis Stadium; Referee: Kaitlyn Trowbridge |

| August 14 21 | Inter Miami CF II | 2–2 (1–3 p) | Huntsville City FC | Fort Lauderdale, Florida |
| 7:00 PM EDT | Saja 23', 87'; Abadia-Reda (yellow card) 33' | Report | Carleton 16'; Gill 40'; Barrett (red card) 62'; Véliz (yellow card) 90+4' | Stadium: Chase Stadium; Referee: Alejo Calume |
| | Penalties |
| | Sumalla (penalty missed); Zeltzer-Zubida (penalty missed); Cohen (penalty scored); Pintér (penalty missed) | | (penalty missed) Mayaka; (penalty scored) Knight; (penalty scored) Véliz; (penalty scored) Casas |

| August 17 22 | Huntsville City FC | 2–1 | NYCFC II | Huntsville, Alabama |
| 7:00 PM EDT | Ka 45+2'; Carmichael (yellow card) 53'; Knight (yellow card) 64'; Bowen (yellow card) 83'; Jones 90+3' | Report | Lacher 15'; Tiao (yellow card) 78' | Stadium: Wicks Family Field at Joe Davis Stadium; Referee: Edson Carvajal |

| August 23 23 | Chattanooga FC | 1–0 | Huntsville City FC | Chattanooga, Tennessee |
| 7:00 PM EDT | Husakiwsky 22' (yellow card) 30'; Mendonca (yellow card) 45' | Report | Mayaka (yellow card) 76'; Barker John (yellow card) 81' | Stadium: Finley Stadium; Attendance: 3,266; Referee: Gerald Flores |

| August 30 24 | Atlanta United 2 | 2–0 | Huntsville City FC | Kennesaw, Georgia |
| 7:30 PM EDT | Sanchez 7'; Pita (yellow card) 35'; Majub 43'; Torres (yellow card) 84' | Report | Casas (yellow card) 9'; Véliz (yellow card) 83' | Stadium: Fifth Third Bank Stadium; Referee: Jordan Gray |

| September 8 14 | New England Revolution II | 1–0 | Huntsville City FC | Foxborough, Massachusetts |
| 7:00 PM EDT | Souza (yellow card) 36'; Oliveira 45'; Barry (yellow card) 75'; Buck (yellow card) 86'; McIntosh (yellow card) 90+1'; Tsicoulias (yellow card) 90+4'; Parisian (yellow card) 90+5' | Report | Mayaka (yellow card) 21'; Knight (yellow card) 53'; Véliz (yellow card) 80'; Carleton (yellow card) 90+3' | Stadium: Gillette Stadium; Referee: Velimir Stefanovic |
Note: Match was originally going to be played on June 29 but was postponed due to travel disruptions.

| September 13 25 | Huntsville City FC | 2–3 | New York Red Bulls 2 | Huntsville, Alabama |
| 8:00 PM EDT | Barrett (yellow card) 61' (goal) 81'; Carleton 73' | Report | Gutierrez (yellow card) 26'; Jiménez 48'; Nelich 75'; Collahuazo (yellow card) 80'; Benedetti 90+1' | Stadium: Wicks Family Field at Joe Davis Stadium; Referee: Amin Hadzic |

| September 21 26 | Orlando City B | 0–1 | Huntsville City FC | Kissimmee, Florida |
| 7:00 PM EDT | Guske (yellow card) 35'; Rodríguez (yellow card) 75'; Ellis (yellow card) 90+2' | Report | Studenhofft (yellow card) 52'; Ekk 80' (yellow card) 84' | Stadium: Osceola Heritage Park; Referee: Luis Diego Arroyo |

| September 28 27 | Huntsville City FC | 4–1 | Inter Miami CF II | Huntsville, Alabama |
| 8:00 PM EDT | Ekk 46'; Gill 67'; Barker John 71'; Carleton 90' | Report | Marin (red card) 4'; Pintér 61' | Stadium: Wicks Family Field at Joe Davis Stadium; Referee: Stephanie MacFarland |

| October 5 28 | Huntsville City FC | 3–0 | Carolina Core FC | Huntsville, Alabama |
| 1:00 PM EDT | Ekk 8', 22' (yellow card) 72'; Barker John (yellow card) 70'; Gill 77'; Coulibaly (red card) 90+6' | Report | Sutton (yellow card) 72'; Alenga (yellow card) 90+2' | Stadium: Wicks Family Field at Joe Davis Stadium; Referee: Calin Radosav |

=== Playoffs ===
| October 19 Conference Quarterfinals | Chattanooga FC | 0–2 | Huntsville City FC | Chattanooga, Tennessee |
| 7:00 PM EDT | Garcia (yellow card) 22'; Sar-Sar (yellow card) 67' | Report | Carleton (yellow card) 38'; Mayaka 42'; Barker John (yellow card) 54'; Koffi 76'; Casas (yellow card) 78' | Stadium: Finley Stadium; Attendance: 4,732; Referee: Elvis Osmanovic |

| October 26 Conference Semifinals | Philadelphia Union II | 1–0 | Huntsville City FC | Chester, Pennsylvania |
| 6:00 PM EDT | Sequera (yellow card) 14'; Pierre (yellow card) 17'; Korzeniowski 67' (pen.) | Report | Rose (yellow card) 5'; Mayaka (yellow card) 8'; Valdez (yellow card) 66'; Applewhite (yellow card) 72' | Stadium: Subaru Park; Referee: Matthew Thompson |

== Stats ==
=== Appearances and goals ===
| No. | Pos | Nat | Player | Total | | MLS Next Pro | | MLSNP Playoffs | |
| No. | Pos | Nat | Player | Apps | Goals | Apps | Goals | Apps | Goals |
|---|---|---|---|---|---|---|---|---|---|
| 1 | GK | (United States) USA | Erik Lauta | 15 | 0 | 15+0 | 0 | 0+0 | 0 |
| 2 | DF | (United States) USA | Blake Bowen | 24 | 1 | 22+1 | 1 | 0+1 | 0 |
| 3 | DF | (United States) USA | Taylor Washington | 1 | 0 | 1+0 | 0 | 0+0 | 0 |
| 4 | MF | (Ghana) GHA | Patrick Amarh | 1 | 0 | 0+1 | 0 | 0+0 | 0 |
| 5 | DF | (United States) USA | Wyatt Meyer | 6 | 0 | 6+0 | 0 | 0+0 | 0 |
| 6 | MF | (Spain) ESP | Pep Casas | 29 | 0 | 23+4 | 0 | 2+0 | 0 |
| 7 | MF | (Republic of Ireland) IRL | Ethan O'Brien | 27 | 2 | 20+6 | 2 | 0+1 | 0 |
| 8 | MF | (United States) USA | Jonathan Hernandez | 1 | 0 | 0+1 | 0 | 0+0 | 0 |
| 8 | MF | (Panama) PAN | Moisés Véliz | 20 | 1 | 11+9 | 1 | 0+0 | 0 |
| 9 | FW | (United States) USA | Gio Miglietti | 17 | 0 | 10+5 | 0 | 0+2 | 0 |
| 10 | MF | (France) FRA | Christian Koffi | 20 | 11 | 17+1 | 10 | 2+0 | 1 |
| 11 | FW | (Trinidad and Tobago) TTO | Real Gill | 16 | 3 | 9+6 | 3 | 0+1 | 0 |
| 12 | DF | (United States) USA | Tyshawn Rose | 26 | 0 | 14+10 | 0 | 2+0 | 0 |
| 13 | MF | (United States) USA | Bryce Boneau | 6 | 0 | 2+4 | 0 | 0+0 | 0 |
| 14 | FW | (United States) USA | Alioune Ka | 7 | 1 | 5+2 | 1 | 0+0 | 0 |
| 15 | FW | (Grenada) GRN | Damien Barker John | 26 | 3 | 12+12 | 3 | 2+0 | 0 |
| 16 | FW | (Cayman Islands) CAY | Gunnar Studenhofft | 23 | 5 | 9+13 | 5 | 0+1 | 0 |
| 17 | FW | (United States) USA | Malik Henry-Scott | 6 | 0 | 0+6 | 0 | 0+0 | 0 |
| 18 | MF | (United States) USA | Matthew Corcoran | 1 | 0 | 1+0 | 0 | 0+0 | 0 |
| 19 | FW | (Canada) CAN | Jordan Knight | 20 | 5 | 12+6 | 5 | 2+0 | 0 |
| 20 | DF | (United States) USA | Kevin Carmichael | 21 | 2 | 16+5 | 2 | 0+0 | 0 |
| 21 | DF | (France) FRA | Kessy Coulibaly | 8 | 0 | 3+5 | 0 | 0+0 | 0 |
| 22 | FW | (United States) USA | Maximus Ekk | 7 | 4 | 1+4 | 4 | 2+0 | 0 |
| 23 | GK | (Dominican Republic) DOM | Xavier Valdez | 8 | 0 | 7+0 | 0 | 1+0 | 0 |
| 24 | MF | (Honduras) HON | Bryan Acosta | 1 | 0 | 1+0 | 0 | 0+0 | 0 |
| 28 | DF | (United States) USA | Zach Barrett | 27 | 1 | 24+1 | 1 | 2+0 | 0 |
| 29 | DF | (United States) USA | Julian Gaines | 1 | 0 | 1+0 | 0 | 0+0 | 0 |
| 30 | MF | (United States) USA | Alan Carleton | 25 | 12 | 19+4 | 12 | 2+0 | 0 |
| 33 | DF | (United States) USA | Christian Applewhite | 10 | 0 | 8+0 | 0 | 2+0 | 0 |
| 44 | DF | (United States) USA | Gabriel Alonso | 8 | 0 | 7+1 | 0 | 0+0 | 0 |
| 46 | FW | (United States) USA | Tristian Tropeano | 1 | 0 | 0+1 | 0 | 0+0 | 0 |
| 47 | MF | (Sierra Leone) SLE | Isaiah Jones | 12 | 1 | 2+10 | 1 | 0+0 | 0 |
| 56 | MF | (Mexico) MEX | Jonathan Pérez | 1 | 0 | 1+0 | 0 | 0+0 | 0 |
| 66 | MF | (Kenya) KEN | Philip Mayaka | 25 | 3 | 19+4 | 2 | 2+0 | 1 |
| 77 | MF | (United States) USA | Adem Sipić | 13 | 1 | 4+9 | 1 | 0+0 | 0 |
| 98 | GK | (United States) USA | Ammar Delic | 1 | 0 | 1+0 | 0 | 0+0 | 0 |
| 99 | GK | (United States) USA | Brian Schwake | 6 | 0 | 5+0 | 0 | 1+0 | 0 |

- Last updated: October 25, 2025
- Source: https://www.mlsnextpro.com/clubs/huntsville-city-fc/stats/#season=MLS-SEA-0001K9&competition=mls-next-pro&club=MLS-CLU-00001S&statType=general&position=all

=== Top scorers ===
| Rank | Position | Number | Name | MLS Next Pro | MLSNP Playoffs | Total |
|---|---|---|---|---|---|---|
| 1 | MF | 30 | (United States) Alan Carleton | 12 | 0 | 12 |
| 2 | MF | 10 | (France) Christian Koffi | 10 | 1 | 11 |
| 3 | FW | 16 | (Cayman Islands) Gunnar Studenhofft | 5 | 0 | 5 |
| 3 | FW | 19 | (Canada) Jordan Knight | 5 | 0 | 5 |
| 5 | FW | 22 | (United States) Maximus Ekk | 4 | 0 | 4 |
| 6 | FW | 11 | (Trinidad and Tobago) Real Gill | 3 | 0 | 3 |
| 6 | FW | 15 | (United States) Damien Barker John | 3 | 0 | 3 |
| 6 | MF | 66 | (Kenya) Philip Mayaka | 2 | 1 | 3 |
| 9 | MF | 7 | (Republic of Ireland) Ethan O'Brien | 2 | 0 | 2 |
| 9 | DF | 20 | (United States) Kevin Carmichael | 2 | 0 | 2 |
| 9 | NA | NA | own goal | 2 | 0 | 2 |
| 12 | DF | 2 | (United States) Blake Bowen | 1 | 0 | 1 |
| 12 | MF | 8 | (Panama) Moisés Véliz | 1 | 0 | 1 |
| 12 | FW | 14 | (United States) Alioune Ka | 1 | 0 | 1 |
| 12 | DF | 28 | (United States) Zach Barrett | 1 | 0 | 1 |
| 12 | MF | 47 | (Sierra Leone) Isaiah Jones | 1 | 0 | 1 |
| 12 | MF | 77 | (United States) Adem Sipic | 1 | 0 | 1 |
| Total | | | | 56 | 2 | 58 |

- Last updated: October 19, 2025
- Source: https://www.mlsnextpro.com/clubs/huntsville-city-fc/stats/#season=MLS-SEA-0001K9&competition=mls-next-pro&club=MLS-CLU-00001S&statType=general&position=all

=== Top assists ===
| Rank | Position | Number | Name | MLS Next Pro | MLSNP Playoffs | Total |
|---|---|---|---|---|---|---|
| 1 | MF | 30 | (United States) Alan Carleton | 6 | 0 | 6 |
| 2 | FW | 15 | (United States) Damien Barker John | 5 | 0 | 5 |
| 2 | MF | 10 | (France) Christian Koffi | 4 | 1 | 5 |
| 4 | DF | 12 | (United States) Tyshawn Rose | 3 | 1 | 4 |
| 5 | MF | 7 | (Republic of Ireland) Ethan O'Brien | 3 | 0 | 3 |
| 6 | MF | 8 | (Panama) Moisés Véliz | 2 | 0 | 2 |
| 6 | FW | 11 | (Trinidad and Tobago) Real Gill | 2 | 0 | 2 |
| 6 | DF | 28 | (United States) Zach Barrett | 2 | 0 | 2 |
| 9 | DF | 2 | (United States) Blake Bowen | 1 | 0 | 1 |
| 9 | MF | 6 | (Spain) Pep Casas | 1 | 0 | 1 |
| 9 | MF | 10 | (France) Christian Koffi | 1 | 0 | 1 |
| 9 | FW | 16 | (Cayman Islands) Gunnar Studenhofft | 1 | 0 | 1 |
| 9 | FW | 17 | (United States) Malik Henry-Scott | 1 | 0 | 1 |
| 9 | MF | 18 | (United States) Matthew Corcoran | 1 | 0 | 1 |
| 9 | MF | 24 | (Honduras) Bryan Acosta | 1 | 0 | 1 |
| 9 | MF | 47 | (Sierra Leone) Isaiah Jones | 1 | 0 | 1 |
| 9 | MF | 56 | (Mexico) Jonathan Pérez | 1 | 0 | 1 |
| 9 | MF | 66 | (Kenya) Philip Mayaka | 1 | 0 | 1 |
| Total | | | | 37 | 2 | 39 |

- Last updated: October 19, 2025
- Source: https://www.mlsnextpro.com/clubs/huntsville-city-fc/stats/#season=MLS-SEA-0001K9&competition=mls-next-pro&club=MLS-CLU-00001S&statType=general&position=all

=== Disciplinary record ===
| No. | Pos. | Player | MLS Next Pro | | | MLSNP Playoffs | | | Total | | |
| No. | Pos. | Player | Booked | (yellow card) (yellow-red card) | Sent off (straight red) | Booked | (yellow card) (yellow-red card) | Sent off (straight red) | Booked | (yellow card) (yellow-red card) | Sent off (straight red) |
| 1 | GK | (United States) Erik Lauta | 1 | 0 | 0 | 0 | 0 | 0 | 1 | 0 | 0 |
| 2 | DF | (United States) Blake Bowen | 3 | 0 | 1 | 0 | 0 | 0 | 3 | 0 | 1 |
| 4 | MF | (Ghana) Patrick Amarh | 0 | 0 | 0 | 0 | 0 | 0 | 0 | 0 | 0 |
| 5 | DF | (United States) Wyatt Meyer | 0 | 0 | 0 | 0 | 0 | 0 | 0 | 0 | 0 |
| 6 | MF | (Spain) Pep Casas | 2 | 0 | 0 | 1 | 0 | 0 | 3 | 0 | 0 |
| 7 | MF | (Republic of Ireland) Ethan O'Brien | 3 | 0 | 0 | 0 | 0 | 0 | 3 | 0 | 0 |
| 8 | MF | (Panama) Moisés Véliz | 6 | 0 | 0 | 0 | 0 | 0 | 6 | 0 | 0 |
| 9 | FW | (United States) Gio Miglietti | 0 | 0 | 0 | 0 | 0 | 0 | 0 | 0 | 0 |
| 10 | MF | (France) Christian Koffi | 3 | 0 | 1 | 0 | 0 | 0 | 3 | 0 | 1 |
| 11 | FW | (Trinidad and Tobago) Real Gill | 1 | 0 | 0 | 0 | 0 | 0 | 1 | 0 | 0 |
| 12 | DF | (United States) Tyshawn Rose | 4 | 0 | 0 | 1 | 0 | 0 | 5 | 0 | 0 |
| 13 | MF | (United States) Bryce Boneau | 0 | 0 | 0 | 0 | 0 | 0 | 0 | 0 | 0 |
| 15 | FW | (Grenada) Damien Barker John | 4 | 0 | 0 | 1 | 0 | 0 | 5 | 0 | 0 |
| 16 | FW | (Cayman Islands) Gunnar Studenhofft | 8 | 0 | 0 | 0 | 0 | 0 | 8 | 0 | 0 |
| 17 | FW | (United States) Malik Henry-Scott | 1 | 0 | 0 | 0 | 0 | 0 | 1 | 0 | 0 |
| 19 | MF | (United States) Jordan Knight | 3 | 0 | 0 | 0 | 0 | 0 | 3 | 0 | 0 |
| 20 | DF | (United States) Kevin Carmichael | 3 | 0 | 0 | 0 | 0 | 0 | 3 | 0 | 0 |
| 21 | DF | (France) Kessy Coulibaly | 0 | 0 | 1 | 0 | 0 | 0 | 0 | 0 | 1 |
| 22 | FW | (France) Maximus Ekk | 2 | 0 | 0 | 0 | 0 | 0 | 2 | 0 | 0 |
| 23 | GK | (Dominican Republic) Xavier Valdez | 1 | 0 | 0 | 1 | 0 | 0 | 2 | 0 | 0 |
| 24 | MF | (Honduras) Bryan Acosta | 0 | 0 | 0 | 0 | 0 | 0 | 0 | 0 | 0 |
| 28 | DF | (United States) Zach Barrett | 4 | 0 | 1 | 0 | 0 | 0 | 4 | 0 | 1 |
| 29 | DF | (United States) Julian Gaines | 1 | 0 | 0 | 0 | 0 | 0 | 1 | 0 | 0 |
| 30 | MF | (United States) Alan Carleton | 3 | 0 | 0 | 1 | 0 | 0 | 4 | 0 | 0 |
| 33 | DF | (United States) Christian Applewhite | 0 | 0 | 0 | 1 | 0 | 0 | 1 | 0 | 0 |
| 44 | DF | (United States) Gabriel Alonso | 2 | 0 | 0 | 0 | 0 | 0 | 2 | 0 | 0 |
| 47 | MF | (Sierra Leone) Isaiah Jones | 1 | 0 | 0 | 0 | 0 | 0 | 1 | 0 | 0 |
| 66 | MF | (Kenya) Philip Mayaka | 5 | 0 | 0 | 1 | 0 | 0 | 6 | 0 | 0 |
| 77 | DF | (United States) Adem Sipic | 0 | 0 | 0 | 0 | 0 | 0 | 0 | 0 | 0 |
| 98 | GK | (United States) Ammar Delic | 0 | 0 | 0 | 0 | 0 | 0 | 0 | 0 | 0 |
| Total | | | 61 | 0 | 4 | 7 | 0 | 0 | 68 | 0 | 4 |

- Last updated: October 25, 2025
- Source: https://www.mlsnextpro.com/clubs/huntsville-city-fc/stats/#season=MLS-SEA-0001K9&competition=mls-next-pro&club=MLS-CLU-00001S&statType=general&position=all

== Awards and honors ==
=== MLS NEXT Pro Team of the Matchweek ===
| Matchweek | Reference |
|---|---|
| 6 | |
| 23 | |

=== MLS NEXT Pro Player of the Matchweek ===
| Week | Player | Ref |
|---|---|---|
| 15 | (United States) Alan Carleton | |
| 17 | (United States) Alan Carleton | |

=== MLS NEXT Pro Best XI ===
| Player | Position | Ref |
|---|---|---|
| (Canada) Jordan Knight | Defender, Honorable Mention | |
| (United States) Alan Carleton | Midfielder | |
