= 2026 League of Ireland play-offs =

League of Ireland play-offs
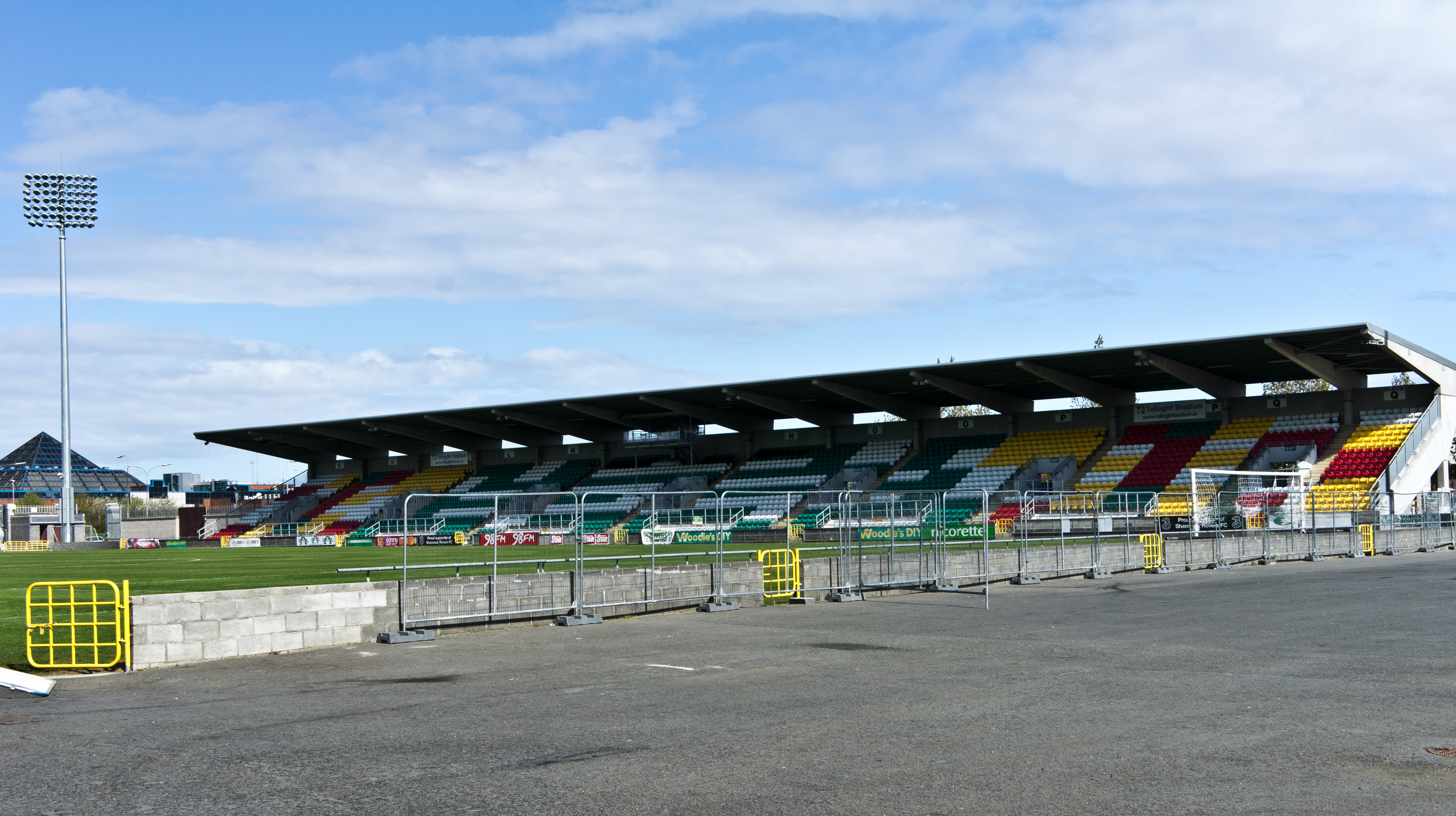
- Tallaght Stadium which will be the venue for the play-off final
- Season: 2026
- Semi-finals (Eliminated): Kerry, Longford Town
- Final (Eliminated): Bray Wnaderers,
- Promotion/Relegation (Relegated): Drogheda United
- Promotion/Relegation (Promoted): UCD

The League of Ireland play-offs for the 2026 season were held in October and November 2026 with the final staged at Tallaght Stadium in Dublin.

The play-offs began with two semi-finals which were played over two legs. The teams who finished in 2nd to 5th place in the First Division competed. The winners of the semi-finals advanced to the finals, with the finals winners going on to face the team that finished 9th in the Premier Division for a spot in next season's Premier Division.

The play-offs ended with UCD defeating Drogheda United in the Promotion/relegation play-off to earn a spot in the Premier Division in 2027 and to send Drogheda down to the First Division for 2027.

== Semi-finals ==
=== Background ===
==== League table ====
Pos	Team	Pld	W	D	L	GF	GA	GD	Pts	Promotion or qualification
1	Cork City	36	23	6	7	74	35	+39	75	Promotion to the League of Ireland Premier Division
2	UCD	36	16	8	12	67	51	+16	56	Qualification for the First Division play-offs
3	Bray Wanderers	36	15	9	12	67	53	+14	54	Qualification for the First Division play-offs
4	Kerry	36	14	10	12	45	41	+4	52	Qualification for the First Division play-offs
5	Longford Town	36	14	10	12	49	46	+3	52	Qualification for the First Division play-offs
6	Cobh Ramblers	36	14	7	15	46	54	−8	49	
7	Athlone Town	36	13	9	14	42	43	−1	48	

Source: SSE Airtricity League of Ireland First Division
Rules for classification: 1) Points; 2) Goal difference; 3) Goals scored

=== UCD vs Longford Town ===
==== First leg ====
24 October 2026
19:30 IST

Longford Town	0−2	UCD
	Report	Dignam 27'; Smith 77'

Bishopsgate, Longford
Attendance: 1,728
Referee: Declan Toland

Longford Town	UCD

GK	1	(Republic of Ireland) Kian Moore
DF	5	(Republic of Ireland) Taylor McCarthy
DF	6	(Nigeria) Sultan Adenekan
DF	12	(Republic of Ireland) Cole Omorehiomwan
DF	21	(Republic of Ireland) Jake Hough	(yellow card) 34'
MF	8	(Republic of Ireland) Pharrell Manuel	(yellow card) 52'	(substituted off) 75'
MF	10	(Republic of Ireland) Aaron Doran		(substituted off) 75'
MF	16	(Republic of Ireland) James Bailey	(yellow card) 29'	(substituted off) 75'
MF	20	(Republic of Ireland) Alex O'Brien (c)		(substituted off) 87'
MF	28	(Republic of Ireland) Sean Moore		(substituted off) 87'
FW	15	(Republic of Ireland) Daragh Murtagh
Substitutes:
GK	25	(Republic of Ireland) Liam Woodcock
DF	26	(Republic of Ireland) Jamie Egan
MF	4	(Republic of Ireland) Daniel McKenna		(substituted on) 87'
MF	11	(Republic of Ireland) Matthew Harris		(substituted on) 87'
MF	18	(Republic of Ireland) Scott Brady
MF	23	(Republic of Ireland) Andy Paraschiv		(substituted on) 75'
MF	27	(Republic of Ireland) Kian Brunton
FW	7	(Republic of Ireland) Dean George		(substituted on) 75'
FW	9	(Republic of Ireland) Stefan Ugbesia		(substituted on) 75'
Manager:
(Republic of Ireland) Wayne Groves

GK	1	(Republic of Ireland) Dara Kavanagh	(yellow card) 36'
DF	2	(Republic of Ireland) Sean Murphy		(substituted off) 90'
DF	3	(Republic of Ireland) Luca Cailloce
DF	5	(Republic of Ireland) Carl Lennox
DF	14	(Republic of Ireland) Harry Curtis
MF	8	(Republic of Ireland) Louis Dignam
MF	10	(Republic of Ireland) Ciaran Behan
MF	13	(Republic of Ireland) Jayden Goad		(substituted off) 82'
FW	7	(Republic of Ireland) Mikey McCullagh (c)		(substituted off) 82'
FW	11	(Republic of Ireland) Hugh Smith
FW	15	(Republic of Ireland) Charles Akinrintayo		(substituted off) 71'
Substitutes:
GK	16	(Republic of Ireland) Noah Douglas
DF	26	(Republic of Ireland) Daniel Costello
MF	22	(Republic of Ireland) Thomas Morley		(substituted on) 82'
MF	23	(Republic of Ireland) Ryan McBrearty
MF	31	(Republic of Ireland) Stephen Mohan		(substituted on) 82'
FW	12	(Republic of Ireland) Matthew Alonge
FW	21	(Republic of Ireland) Goodness Ogbonna
FW	24	(Republic of Ireland) Sam Norval	(yellow card) 90+1'	(substituted on) 71'
FW	27	(Republic of Ireland) Eoin Sheeran		(substituted on) 90'
Manager:
(Republic of Ireland) William O'Connor

==== Second leg ====
27 October 2026
19:45 IST

UCD	2−0	Longford Town
McCullagh 20'; Smith 57'	Report

UCD Bowl, Dublin
Attendance: 872
Referee: Oliver Moran

UCD	Longford Town

GK	1	(Republic of Ireland) Dara Kavanagh
DF	2	(Republic of Ireland) Sean Murphy	(substituted off) 73'
DF	3	(Republic of Ireland) Luca Cailloce
DF	5	(Republic of Ireland) Carl Lennox
DF	14	(Republic of Ireland) Harry Curtis
MF	8	(Republic of Ireland) Louis Dignam
MF	10	(Republic of Ireland) Ciaran Behan	(substituted off) 73'
MF	13	(Republic of Ireland) Jayden Goad	(substituted off) 68'
FW	7	(Republic of Ireland) Mikey McCullagh (c)	(substituted off) 79'
FW	11	(Republic of Ireland) Hugh Smith	(substituted off) 68'
FW	24	(Republic of Ireland) Sam Norval
Substitutes:
GK	16	(Republic of Ireland) Noah Douglas
DF	6	(Republic of Ireland) Adam Wells	(substituted on) 73'
MF	19	(Republic of Ireland) Colin Bolton
MF	22	(Republic of Ireland) Thomas Morley	(substituted on) 68'
MF	31	(Republic of Ireland) Stephen Mohan	(substituted on) 68'
FW	12	(Republic of Ireland) Matthew Alonge	(substituted on) 79'
FW	15	(Republic of Ireland) Charles Akinrintayo	(substituted on) 73'
FW	21	(Republic of Ireland) Goodness Ogbonna
FW	27	(Republic of Ireland) Eoin Sheeran
Manager:
(Republic of Ireland) William O'Connor

GK	1	(Republic of Ireland) Kian Moore
DF	5	(Republic of Ireland) Taylor McCarthy
DF	6	(Nigeria) Sultan Adenekan	(yellow card) 2'	(substituted off) 45'
DF	12	(Republic of Ireland) Cole Omorehiomwan		(substituted off) 76'
DF	21	(Republic of Ireland) Jake Hough	(yellow card) 60'
MF	8	(Republic of Ireland) Pharrell Manuel		(substituted off) 66'
MF	10	(Republic of Ireland) Aaron Doran
MF	20	(Republic of Ireland) Alex O'Brien (c)
MF	23	(Republic of Ireland) Andy Paraschiv		(substituted off) 66'
MF	28	(Republic of Ireland) Sean Moore		(substituted off) 66'
FW	15	(Republic of Ireland) Daragh Murtagh
Substitutes:
GK	25	(Republic of Ireland) Liam Woodcock
DF	26	(Republic of Ireland) Jamie Egan		(substituted on) 66'
MF	4	(Republic of Ireland) Daniel McKenna		(substituted on) 76'
MF	11	(Republic of Ireland) Matthew Harris
MF	18	(Republic of Ireland) Scott Brady		(substituted on) 66'
MF	27	(Republic of Ireland) Kian Brunton
FW	7	(Republic of Ireland) Dean George		(substituted on) 66'
FW	9	(Republic of Ireland) Stefan Ugbesia		(substituted on) 45'
FW	19	(Republic of Ireland) Fran Campbell
Manager:
(Republic of Ireland) Wayne Groves

UCD won 4−0 on aggregate.

=== Bray Wanderers vs Kerry ===
==== First leg ====
24 October 2026
19:45 IST

Kerry	1−2	Bray Wanderers
McGrath 69'; O'Connell (red card) 90+1'	Report	Ferizaj 54'; McCormack 66'

Mounthawk Park, Kerry
Attendance: 1,120
Referee: Daniel Murphy

Kerry	Bray Wanderers

GK	1	(Republic of Ireland) Matthew Connor
DF	3	(Republic of Ireland) Sean O'Connell
DF	14	(Finland) Jonas Häkkinen
DF	18	(Republic of Ireland) Samuel Aladesanusi
DF	29	(Republic of Ireland) Ewan Lee
MF	24	(United States) Vincent Borden	(yellow card) 24'
MF	28	(England) Niall Brookwell
MF	41	(Republic of Ireland) Cian Bargary	(yellow card) 35'
FW	7	(Republic of Ireland) Seán McGrath (c)		(substituted off) 83'
FW	10	(Republic of Ireland) Cian Murphy
FW	11	(Republic of Ireland) Daniel Okwute		(substituted off) 63'
Substitutes:
GK	44	(Republic of Ireland) Harry Halwax
DF	37	(Republic of Ireland) Callum McCormack
MF	23	(Republic of Ireland) Ryan Perez
MF	34	(Republic of Ireland) Robert Keane	(yellow card) 65'	(substituted on) 63'
MF	35	(Republic of Ireland) Arran Healy		(substituted on) 83'
FW	17	(Republic of Ireland) Cian Brosnan
FW	21	(Republic of Ireland) Luke Palmer
Manager:
(Republic of Ireland) Colin Healy

GK	13	(Republic of Ireland) Rian Hogan
DF	2	(Republic of Ireland) Alain Kizenga
DF	4	(Republic of Ireland) Jamie Duggan
DF	12	(Republic of Ireland) Declan Osagie
MF	6	(Sierra Leone) John Sesay		(substituted off) 61'
MF	10	(Republic of Ireland) Richard Ferizaj
MF	20	(Republic of Ireland) Tyreik Sammy
MF	27	(Republic of Ireland) Dean O'Shea (c)
FW	17	(Republic of Ireland) Ajibola Oluwabiyi		(substituted off) 81'
FW	18	(Republic of Ireland) Ben McCormack
FW	21	(Albania) Endri Mustali	(yellow card) 68'	(substituted off) 71'
Substitutes:
GK	25	(Republic of Ireland) Stephen McGuinness
DF	5	(Australia) Steven Havales
MF	7	(Republic of Ireland) Conor Knight
MF	14	(Democratic Republic of the Congo) Aime Azende		(substituted on) 81'
MF	15	(Republic of Ireland) Ryan Kelly		(substituted on) 71'
MF	19	(Republic of Ireland) Zak Reddy
MF	23	(Republic of Ireland) Jamie Ryan	(yellow card) 90'	(substituted on) 61'
MF	30	(Republic of Ireland) Ethan Cheese
Manager:
(Republic of Ireland) Paul Heffernan

==== Second leg ====
27 October 2026
19:45 IST

Bray Wanderers	3−0	Kerry
Sesay 33'; Sammy 74'; Duggan 86'	Report	Brosnan (red card) 54'

Carlisle Grounds, Bray
Attendance: 2,550
Referee: Lucas Keating

Bray Wanderers	Kerry

GK	13	(Republic of Ireland) Rian Hogan
DF	2	(Republic of Ireland) Alain Kizenga
DF	4	(Republic of Ireland) Jamie Duggan
DF	12	(Republic of Ireland) Declan Osagie
DF	27	(Republic of Ireland) Dean O'Shea (c)
MF	6	(Sierra Leone) John Sesay	(substituted off) 78'
MF	10	(Republic of Ireland) Richard Ferizaj	(substituted off) 78'
MF	18	(Republic of Ireland) Ben McCormack	(substituted off) 85'
FW	17	(Republic of Ireland) Ajibola Oluwabiyi	(substituted off) 85'
FW	20	(Republic of Ireland) Tyreik Sammy
FW	21	(Albania) Endri Mustali	(substituted off) 83'
Substitutes:
GK	25	(Republic of Ireland) Stephen McGuinness
DF	5	(Australia) Steven Havales
MF	7	(Republic of Ireland) Conor Knight	(substituted on) 85'
MF	14	(Democratic Republic of the Congo) Aime Azende	(substituted on) 83'
MF	15	(Republic of Ireland) Ryan Kelly	(substituted on) 85'
MF	19	(Republic of Ireland) Zak Reddy
MF	23	(Republic of Ireland) Jamie Ryan	(substituted on) 78'
MF	30	(Republic of Ireland) Ethan Cheese	(substituted on) 78'
FW	11	(Nigeria) Ifunanyachi Achara
Manager:
(Republic of Ireland) Paul Heffernan

GK	1	(Republic of Ireland) Matthew Connor
DF	14	(Finland) Jonas Häkkinen
DF	18	(Republic of Ireland) Samuel Aladesanusi
DF	29	(Republic of Ireland) Ewan Lee	(yellow card) 46'
DF	34	(Republic of Ireland) Robert Keane		(substituted off) 62'
MF	7	(Republic of Ireland) Seán McGrath (c)
MF	17	(Republic of Ireland) Cian Brosnan
MF	24	(United States) Vincent Borden
FW	10	(Republic of Ireland) Cian Murphy	(yellow card) 21'
FW	11	(Republic of Ireland) Daniel Okwute		(substituted off) 70'
FW	41	(Republic of Ireland) Cian Bargary	(yellow card) 73'
Substitutes:
GK	44	(Republic of Ireland) Harry Halwax
DF	37	(Republic of Ireland) Callum McCormack
MF	23	(Republic of Ireland) Ryan Perez
MF	35	(Republic of Ireland) Arran Healy		(substituted on) 62'
MF	51	(Republic of Ireland) Charlie Campbell
FW	21	(Republic of Ireland) Luke Palmer		(substituted on) 70'
Manager:
(Republic of Ireland) Colin Healy

Bray Wanderers won 5−1 on aggregate.

== Final ==
=== Details ===
1 November 2026
15:00 IST

Bray Wanderers	1−3	UCD
O'Shea 27'	Report	Norval 32'; Behan 39'; Smith 81'

Tolka Park, Dublin
Attendance: 2,586
Referee: Mark Houlihan

Bray Wanderers	UCD

GK	13	(Republic of Ireland) Rian Hogan
DF	2	(Republic of Ireland) Alain Kizenga
DF	4	(Republic of Ireland) Jamie Duggan
DF	12	(Republic of Ireland) Declan Osagie
DF	27	(Republic of Ireland) Dean O'Shea (c)		(substituted off) 85'
MF	6	(Sierra Leone) John Sesay	(yellow card) 44'	(substituted off) 75'
MF	10	(Republic of Ireland) Richard Ferizaj
MF	18	(Republic of Ireland) Ben McCormack	(yellow card) 62'
FW	17	(Republic of Ireland) Ajibola Oluwabiyi
FW	20	(Republic of Ireland) Tyreik Sammy
FW	21	(Albania) Endri Mustali		(substituted off) 75'
Substitutes:
GK	25	(Republic of Ireland) Stephen McGuinness
DF	5	(Australia) Steven Havales
MF	7	(Republic of Ireland) Conor Knight
MF	15	(Republic of Ireland) Ryan Kelly		(substituted on) 85'
MF	16	(United States) Kyle Tucker
MF	19	(Republic of Ireland) Zak Reddy
MF	23	(Republic of Ireland) Jamie Ryan
MF	30	(Republic of Ireland) Ethan Cheese		(substituted on) 75'
FW	11	(Nigeria) Ifunanyachi Achara		(substituted on) 75'
Manager:
(Republic of Ireland) Paul Heffernan

GK	1	(Republic of Ireland) Dara Kavanagh
DF	2	(Republic of Ireland) Sean Murphy	(yellow card) 23'
DF	3	(Republic of Ireland) Luca Cailloce
DF	5	(Republic of Ireland) Carl Lennox
DF	14	(Republic of Ireland) Harry Curtis
MF	6	(Republic of Ireland) Adam Wells (c)		(substituted off) 75'
MF	8	(Republic of Ireland) Louis Dignam	(yellow card) 54'
MF	10	(Republic of Ireland) Ciaran Behan
FW	7	(Republic of Ireland) Mikey McCullagh	(yellow card) 43'
FW	11	(Republic of Ireland) Hugh Smith
FW	24	(Republic of Ireland) Sam Norval
Substitutes:
GK	16	(Republic of Ireland) Noah Douglas
MF	13	(Republic of Ireland) Jayden Goad		(substituted on) 75'
MF	19	(Republic of Ireland) Colin Bolton
MF	22	(Republic of Ireland) Thomas Morley
MF	31	(Republic of Ireland) Stephen Mohan
FW	12	(Republic of Ireland) Matthew Alonge
FW	15	(Republic of Ireland) Charles Akinrintayo
FW	21	(Republic of Ireland) Goodness Ogbonna
FW	27	(Republic of Ireland) Eoin Sheeran
Manager:
(Republic of Ireland) William O'Connor

== Promotion/relegation play-off ==
=== Background ===
Drogheda United will take on the winners of the Play-off final as a result of them finishing 9th in the League of Ireland Premier Division.

==== League Table ====
Pos	Team	Pld	W	D	L	GF	GA	GD	Pts	Qualification or relegation
6	Dundalk	36	11	12	13	55	59	−4	45	
7	Waterford	36	10	13	13	54	61	−7	43	
8	Galway United	36	10	12	14	46	53	−7	42	
9	Drogheda United (R)	36	10	10	16	44	57	−13	40	Qualification for promotion/relegation play-off
10	Sligo Rovers (R)	36	5	10	21	28	66	−38	25	Relegation to League of Ireland First Division

Source: League of Ireland
Rules for classification: 1) Points; 2) Goal difference; 3) Goals scored.
(R) Relegated

=== Details ===
7 November 2026
17:30 IST

UCD	2−1	Drogheda United
Behan 35'; Dignam 66'	Report	Doyle 19'

Tallaght Stadium, Dublin
Attendance: 3,112
Referee: Paul McLaughlin

UCD	Drogheda United

GK	1	(Republic of Ireland) Dara Kavanagh
DF	2	(Republic of Ireland) Sean Murphy
DF	3	(Republic of Ireland) Luca Cailloce
DF	5	(Republic of Ireland) Carl Lennox	(yellow card) 85'
DF	14	(Republic of Ireland) Harry Curtis
MF	6	(Republic of Ireland) Adam Wells (c)
MF	8	(Republic of Ireland) Louis Dignam
MF	10	(Republic of Ireland) Ciaran Behan
FW	7	(Republic of Ireland) Mikey McCullagh
FW	11	(Republic of Ireland) Hugh Smith
FW	24	(Republic of Ireland) Sam Norval		(substituted off) 73'
Substitutes:
GK	16	(Republic of Ireland) Noah Douglas
MF	13	(Republic of Ireland) Jayden Goad
MF	19	(Republic of Ireland) Colin Bolton
MF	22	(Republic of Ireland) Thomas Morley
MF	31	(Republic of Ireland) Stephen Mohan		(substituted on) 73'
FW	12	(Republic of Ireland) Matthew Alonge
FW	15	(Republic of Ireland) Charles Akinrintayo
FW	21	(Republic of Ireland) Goodness Ogbonna
FW	27	(Republic of Ireland) Eoin Sheeran
Manager:
(Republic of Ireland) William O'Connor

GK	44	(England) Fynn Talley
DF	2	(Republic of Ireland) Edwin Agbaje
DF	3	(Republic of Ireland) Conor Kane
DF	4	(Republic of Ireland) Andrew Quinn		(substituted off) 73'
DF	5	(United States) Leo Burney
DF	22	(Republic of Ireland) Conor Keeley (c)	(yellow card) 14'
MF	8	(Republic of Ireland) Ethan O'Brien		(substituted off) 67'
MF	15	(England) Alfie Bates		(substituted off) 80'
FW	10	(Republic of Ireland) Brandon Kavanagh
FW	11	(Republic of Ireland) Thomas Oluwa		(substituted off) 80'
FW	14	(Republic of Ireland) Mark Doyle
Substitutes:
GK	36	(Republic of Ireland) Theo Hennessey
DF	18	(Republic of Ireland) James Bolger
DF	31	(Republic of Ireland) Kieran Cruise
MF	6	(New Zealand) Jago Godden		(substituted on) 80'
MF	18	(Republic of Ireland) Shane Farrell		(substituted on) 67'
MF	19	(Republic of Ireland) Ryan Brennan		(substituted on) 80'
FW	9	(United States) Keegan Ancelin		(substituted on) 73'
FW	25	(Republic of Ireland) Ryan Markey
FW	32	(Republic of Ireland) Daniel Mare
Manager:
(Republic of Ireland) Kevin Doherty

UCD were promoted to the 2027 League of Ireland Premier Division, Drogheda United were relegated to the 2027 League of Ireland First Division.

== See also ==
- 2026 FAI National League play-offs
