= Jamie Egan =

Irish professional footballer

Personal information
- Date of birth: 1 July 2003 (age 23)
- Place of birth: Dublin, Ireland
- Position: Defender

Team information
- Current team: Longford Town

Youth career
- St. Kevin's Boys
- Bohemians
- 2018: Bray Wanderers
- 2019–2020: Cabinteely
- 2020–2022: Bristol Rovers

Senior career*
Years	Team	Apps	(Gls)
2022–2023	Bristol Rovers	0	(0)
2022	→ Gloucester City (loan)	6	(0)
2023	→ Weymouth (loan)	4	(0)
2023	→ Hereford (loan)	8	(0)
2023	Drogheda United	5	(1)
2024–	Longford Town	22	(0)
- * Club domestic league appearances and goals as of 00:40, 31 July 2026 (UTC)

Jamie Egan (born 1 July 2003) is an Irish professional footballer who plays as a defender for League of Ireland First Division club Longford Town.

== Career ==
=== Bristol Rovers ===
Egan joined Bristol Rovers' academy in 2020 having signed from Cabinteely in his native Ireland. He also featured in the youth teams of Bray Wanderers, Bohemians and St. Kevin's Boys.

On 12 May 2022, Egan signed his first professional contract with Bristol Rovers.

On 6 August 2022, Egan joined National League North club Gloucester City on a one-month youth loan.

On 3 February 2023, joined National League South club Weymouth on a one-month loan.

On 4 March 2023, Egan returned to Hereford on loan for the remainder of the season. He made his second debut for the club the same day in a 1–0 league home win against Kettering.

On 5 July 2023, Egan signed for League of Ireland Premier Division club Drogheda United.

Having left Drogheda at the end of the 2023 season, Egan joined League of Ireland First Division side Longford Town on 30 January 2024.

== Career statistics ==
As of match played 17 February 2024

Appearances and goals by club, season and competition
Club	Season	League			National cup (Note: Includes FA Cup, FAI Cup)		League cup (Note: Includes EFL Cup, League of Ireland Cup)		Other		Total	
Club	Season	Division	Apps	Goals	Apps	Goals	Apps	Goals	Apps	Goals	Apps	Goals
Bristol Rovers	2021–22	League Two	0	0	0	0	0	0	0	0	0	0
Bristol Rovers	2022–23	League One	0	0	0	0	0	0	0	0	0	0
Bristol Rovers	Total		0	0	0	0	0	0	0	0	0	0
Yate Town (loan)	2021–22	Southern Football League; Premier Division South	3	0	2	0	—		0	0	5	0
Hereford (loan)	2021–22	National League North	17	0	0	0	—		0	0	17	0
Gloucester City (loan)	2022–23	National League North	6	0	0	0	—		0	0	6	0
Weymouth (loan)	2022–23	National League South	4	0	0	0	—		0	0	4	0
Hereford (loan)	2022–23	National League North	8	0	0	0	—		0	0	8	0
Drogheda United	2023	League of Ireland; Premier Division	5	1	1	0	—		0	0	6	1
Longford Town	2024	League of Ireland; First Division	11	0	0	0	—		0	0	11	0
Longford Town	2025	League of Ireland; First Division	5	0	0	0	—		0	0	5	0
Longford Town	2026	League of Ireland; First Division	6	0	0	0	—		0	0	6	0
Career total			65	1	3	0	0	0	0	0	68	1
