= Nathan Richmond =

New Zealand triathlete

Nathan Richmond (born 6 July 1979) is an athlete from New Zealand. He competes in triathlon.

Richmond competed in Triathlon at the 2004 Summer Olympics. He placed thirty-third with a total time of 1:58:01.94.
