= Ethan O'Brien =

Irish footballer

Personal information
- Date of birth: 24 January 2001 (age 25)
- Place of birth: Dublin, Ireland
- Height: 1.83 m (6 ft 0 in)
- Position: Midfielder

Team information
- Current team: Drogheda United
- Number: 8

Youth career
- Seattle Sounders Academy
- Columbus Crew Academy

College career
Years	Team	Apps	(Gls)
2019–2023	Notre Dame Fighting Irish	46	(3)

Senior career*
Years	Team	Apps	(Gls)
2024	Indy Eleven	3	(0)
2024	→ Huntsville City (loan)	15	(1)
2025	Huntsville City	26	(2)
2025	Nashville	0	(0)
2026–	Drogheda United	24	(0)
- * Club domestic league appearances and goals as of 17:56, 10 November 2026 (UTC)

Ethan O'Brien (born 24 January 2001) is an Irish professional footballer who plays as a midfielder for League of Ireland First Division club Drogheda United. His previous clubs are Indy Eleven, Huntsville City and Nashville.

== Early life ==
Born in Dublin, Ireland, O'Brien and his family moved to the Bellevue, Washington in the United States when he was two years old due to a change in his father's job. O'Brien's father is Irish and his mother, Nicole, is German. O'Brien has four brothers; Aran represented Santa Clara University and Josh played for the University of Washington. O'Brien attended high school at Eastside Catholic in Washington state.

== Career ==
=== Early career ===
O'Brien came through the Seattle Sounders Academy and helped the club's U15 team to win the Youdan Cup and fourth-place finish at Cayman Airways Invitational, before joining the Columbus Crew Academy where he led them to the quarterfinals of National Development Academy Playoffs. He is a graduate of the University of Notre Dame having joined in 2019 and scored 2 goals in 46 appearances for the Notre Dame Fighting Irish, captaining the team in his final year in 2023.

=== Indy Eleven ===
On 4 March 2024, O'Brien signed for USL Championship club Indy Eleven. On 16 March 2024, he made his debut in senior football, in a 2–1 win away to Memphis 901. Having made just 4 appearances in the opening 3 months of the season he was loaned out to gain experience.

=== Huntsville City ===
On 31 May 2024, O'Brien was loaned out to MLS Next Pro club Huntsville City for the rest of the season. On 1 June 2024, he made his debut for the club in a 4–1 win away to Carolina Core. After impressing during his loan spell, he was signed on a permanent basis ahead of the 2025 season. He made a total of 42 appearances during his year and a half with the club, scoring 3 goals.

=== Nashville ===
With Huntsville City a nursery club of Major League Soccer club Nashville, he was called up to Nashville several times in 2025 and made his debut on 21 May 2025 in a 3–2 win away to Orlando City in the U.S. Open Cup.

=== Drogheda United ===
On 2 December 2025, he returned to his birth country by signing for League of Ireland Premier Division club Drogheda United. He made 28 appearances in all competitions in 2026, as the club was relegated following a 2–1 defeat to UCD in the Promotion/Relegation Playoff.

== Personal life ==
His brother Josh O'Brien is also a professional footballer, with the pair playing together at Indy Eleven in 2024.

== Career statistics ==
As of match played 8 November 2026

Appearances and goals by club, season and competition
Club	Season	League			National Cup (Note: Includes U.S. Open Cup & FAI Cup)		Other		Total	
Club	Season	Division	Apps	Goals	Apps	Goals	Apps	Goals	Apps	Goals
Indy Eleven	2024	USL Championship	3	0	1	0	—		4	0
Huntsville City (loan)	2024	MLS Next Pro	15	1	—		—		15	1
Huntsville City	2025	MLS Next Pro	26	2	0	0	1 (Note: Appearance in the 2025 MLS Next Pro Playoffs)	0	27	2
Nashville	2025	Major League Soccer	0	0	1	0	—		1	0
Drogheda United	2026	LOI Premier Division	24	0	1	0	3 (Note: 2 appearance in the Leinster Senior Cup; 1 appearance in the 2026 League of Ireland play-offs)	0	28	0
Total			68	3	3	0	4	0	74	3
