= Zidane Yáñez =

Chilean footballer (born 2008)

Zidane Yañez
Personal information
- Full name: Zidane Antonio Yáñez Alvarado
- Date of birth: 26 January 2008 (age 18)
- Place of birth: Union, New Jersey, U.S.
- Height: 1.82 m (6 ft 0 in)
- Position: Striker

Team information
- Current team: Huntsville City
- Number: 26

Youth career
- New York Red Bulls
- 2021–2023: New York City

Senior career*
Years	Team	Apps	(Gls)
2023–2026	New York City	0	(0)
2024–2025	New York City II	6	(0)
2026	→ Huntsville City (loan)	2	(0)
2026–	Nashville SC	0	(0)
2026–	Huntsville City	8	(5)

International career
2023	Puerto Rico U15	4	(1)
2023–2024	Chile U15	6	(5)
2024	Chile U16	4	(1)
2025	Chile U17	9	(2)
- * Club domestic league appearances and goals as of 10 September 2026

Zidane Antonio Yáñez Alvarado (born 26 January 2008) is a footballer who plays as a striker for Huntsville City, the reserve team of Nashville SC. Born in the United States, he is a Chile youth international.

== Early life ==
He started playing football at the age of three. He played basketball as a child.

== Club career ==
As a youth player, he joined the youth academy of American side New York Red Bulls. In 2021, he joined the youth academy of American side New York City FC. On 3 June 2026, he was loaned out to Huntsville City in the MLS Next Pro.

On 20 July 2026, Yáñez was transferred to Nashville SC and continued with the reserve team, Huntsville City.

== International career ==
Yañez was called up to play for the Puerto Rico U15s in 2023. He then switched to play for the Chile U15 at the 2023 South American U-15 Championship. In November 2023, he was called up to a training camp for the United States U16s.

At senior level, Yáñez was called up to the Chile senior team as a guest player for the friendly matches against Canada, United States and Mexico in September and October 2026. He was on the bench in the match against the United States.

== Style of play ==
He mainly operates as a striker. He is known for his ability to create attacking opportunities.

== Personal life ==
He was born to a Puerto Rican mother and Chilean father. He has an older brother. He is named after the French football star Zinedine Zidane.

His younger brother, Noah, is a footballer who has represented both the United States and Puerto Rico at youth level.
