= Óscar Pineda =

Guatemalan cyclist

Personal information
- Born: 4 April 1977 (age 49)

Cycling career
- Sport: Cycling

Óscar Pineda (born 4 April 1977) is a Guatemalan cyclist. He competed in the men's individual road race at the 2000 Summer Olympics.
