= Pedro Castro =

Pedro Castro may refer to:

- Pedro Castro Nero (1541–1611), Spanish archbishop
- Pedro de Castro, 1st Duke of la Conquista (1678–1741), Spanish military officer and Viceroy of New Spain
- Pedro Ignacio de Castro Barros (1777–1849), Argentine statesman and priest
- Pedro Adolfo de Castro (1895–1936), Puerto Rican architect
- Pedro Castro (footballer, born 1947), Venezuelan footballer
- Pedro Castro (racquetball) (born 1991), Canadian racquetball player
- Pedro Castro (footballer, born 1993), Brazilian footballer
- Pedro Castro Vázquez (born 1945), Spanish politician

== See also ==
- Pedro Fernández de Castro (disambiguation)
