= Real Gill =

Trinidadian footballer (born 2003)

Personal information
- Full name: Real Nijn Gill
- Date of birth: 23 January 2003 (age 23)
- Place of birth: Port of Spain, Trinidad and Tobago
- Height: 1.70 m (5 ft 7 in)
- Position: Midfielder

Team information
- Current team: One Knoxville SC
- Number: 10

Senior career*
| Years | Team | Apps | (Gls) |
| 2022–2023 | La Horquetta Rangers | | (2) |
| 2023 | Club Sando | | (6) |
| 2024 | Northern Colorado Hailstorm | 13 | (2) |
| 2025 | Huntsville City | 16 | (3) |
| 2026– | One Knoxville SC | 19 | (1) |

International career^{‡}
| 2022 | Trinidad and Tobago U20 | 4 | (1) |
| 2023– | Trinidad and Tobago | 21 | (3) |
- * Club domestic league appearances and goals as of 1 November 2026 ‡ National team caps and goals as of 12 November 2026

Real Nijn Gill (born 23 January 2003) is a Trinidadian footballer who plays for USL League One club One Knoxville SC and the Trinidad and Tobago national team.

== Early life ==
Gill was quoted as saying that in his early life he “didn't have any time to go football or study in school. Where I lived was like a ghetto. It was a very hard place” but that he “ used to try to keep out of it and stay on the straight road” and that “ Football has helped me a lot to come out of this. To be honest, there are gang wars going on, and it (football) has saved my life”.

== Club career ==
Gill began playing regularly for La Horquetta Rangers F.C. in the Ascension League whilst still a teenager. In May, 2023 he signed for Club Sando.

Gill signed with USL League One club Northern Colorado Hailstorm on 16 January 2024.

Gill joined Huntsville City of MLS Next Pro on 16 December 2024.

== International career ==
Gill had his debut call-up for the Trinidad and Tobago national football team in May 2022. He scored his first senior international goal in a friendly match against Saint Martin on 29 January 2023. He was named in the Trinidad and Tobago squad for the 2023 CONCACAF Gold Cup, one of only six domestic-based players called up.

== Career statistics ==
=== International ===
As of match played 12 November 2026

Appearances and goals by national team and year
| National team | Year | Apps | Goals |
|---|---|---|---|
| Trinidad and Tobago | 2023 | 6 | 1 |
| Trinidad and Tobago | 2024 | 7 | 1 |
| Trinidad and Tobago | 2025 | 4 | 0 |
| Trinidad and Tobago | 2026 | 5 | 1 |
| Total | | 21 | 3 |

Scores and results list Trinidad and Tobago's goal tally first, score column indicates score after each Gill goal.

List of international goals scored by Real Gill
| No. | Date | Venue | Opponent | Score | Result | Competition |
|---|---|---|---|---|---|---|
| 1 | 29 January 2023 | Hasely Crawford Stadium, Port of Spain, Trinidad and Tobago | Saint Martin | 2–0 | 2–0 | 2024–25 CONCACAF Nations League |
| 2 | 14 October 2024 | Dwight Yorke Stadium, Scarborough, Trinidad and Tobago | Cuba | 3–1 | 3–1 | 2024–25 CONCACAF Nations League |
| 3 | 12 November 2026 | Sir Vivian Richards Stadium, St. John's, Antigua and Barbuda | Antigua and Barbuda | 2–1 | 3–1 | 2026–27 CONCACAF Nations League |
