= Pep Casas =

Spanish footballer (born 2000)

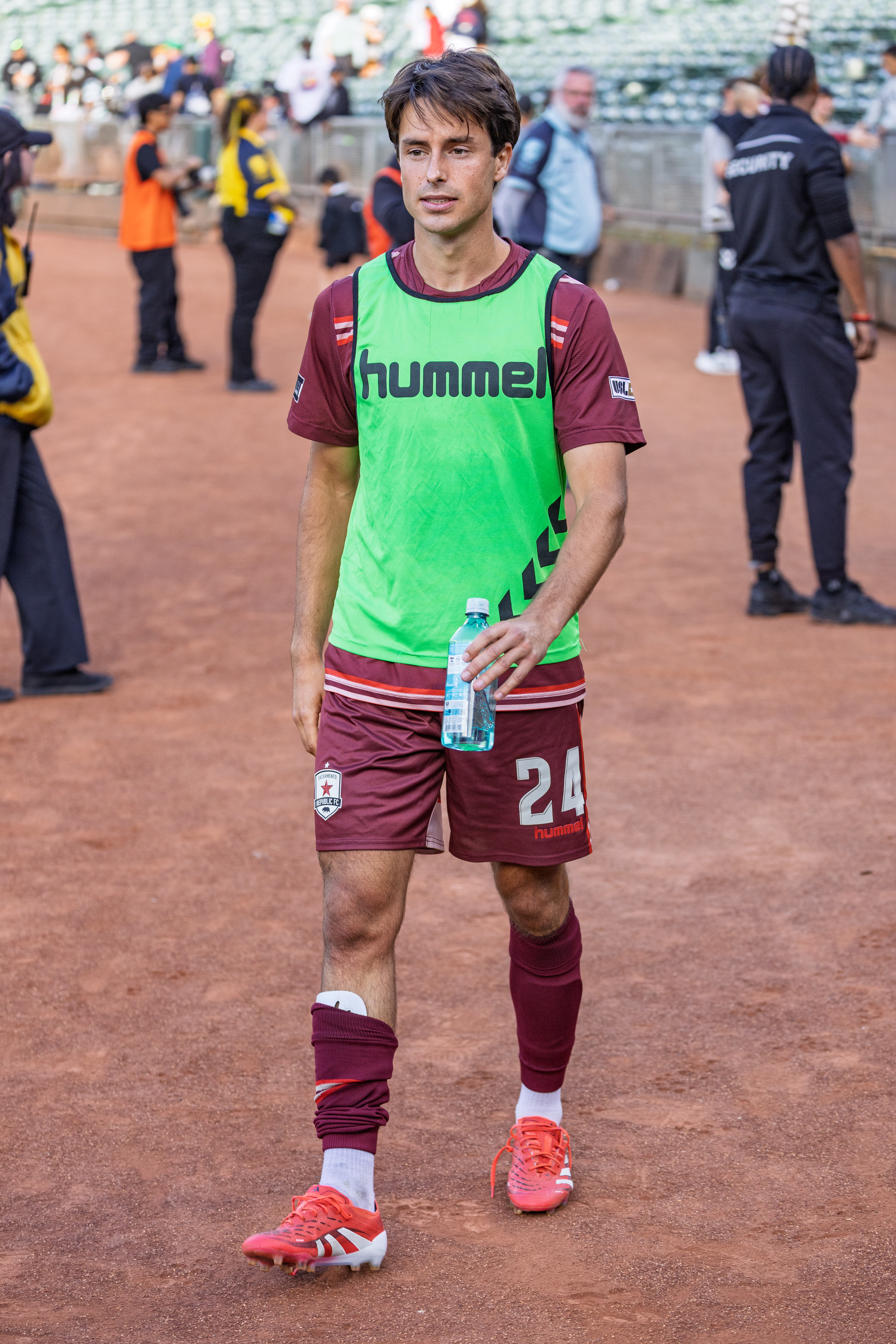
- Casas with the Sacramento Republic in 2026

Personal information
- Full name: José Casas de Abadal
- Date of birth: 20 June 2000 (age 26)
- Place of birth: Barcelona, Spain
- Height: 1.78 m (5 ft 10 in)
- Position: Defensive midfielder

Team information
- Current team: Sacramento Republic
- Number: 24

Youth career
- 2009–2012: Barcelona
- 2012–2013: Ipswich Town
- 2013–2019: Europa

College career
Years	Team	Apps	(Gls)
2019–2021	Indiana Tech Warriors	64	(8)
2021–2023	UNC Wilmington Seahawks	33	(2)

Senior career*
Years	Team	Apps	(Gls)
2021–2022	Fort Wayne	12	(1)
2024	Inter Miami II	24	(0)
2024	Inter Miami	2	(0)
2025	Huntsville City	27	(0)
2026–	Sacramento Republic	26	(0)
- * Club domestic league appearances and goals as of 11:56, 11 November 2026 (UTC)

José "Pep" Casas de Abadal (born 20 June 2000) is a Spanish professional footballer who plays as a midfielder for Sacramento Republic FC in USL Championship.

== Club career ==
Born in Barcelona, Catalonia, Casas began playing football in his hometown with the famed academy La Masia as a child. He had a year-long stint afterwards with the English club Ipswich Town's academy. He finished his development back in Spain with CE Europa where he went up their youth categories before being released. He decided to study postsecondary education in the United States, and joined the Indiana Institute of Technology in 2019 where he played for their soccer team on the side. He moved to University of North Carolina Wilmington in 2021, and began playing with the UNCW Seahawks.

He was selected by Inter Miami in the third round of the 2024 MLS SuperDraft on 19 December 2023. On 23 March 2024, he signed with the senior Inter Miami team on a short-term loan for a Major League Soccer match. He made his senior and professional debut with Inter Miami as a late substitute in a 4–0 loss to New York Red Bulls on 23 March 2024. On 30 March 2024, he signed on another short-term loan with Inter Miami.

On 28 January 2026, Sacramento Republic FC of the USL Championship announced they had signed Casas to a contract for the 2026 season.

== Honours ==
Inter Miami

- Supporters' Shield: 2024
