= Xavier Valdez =

Footballer (born 2003)

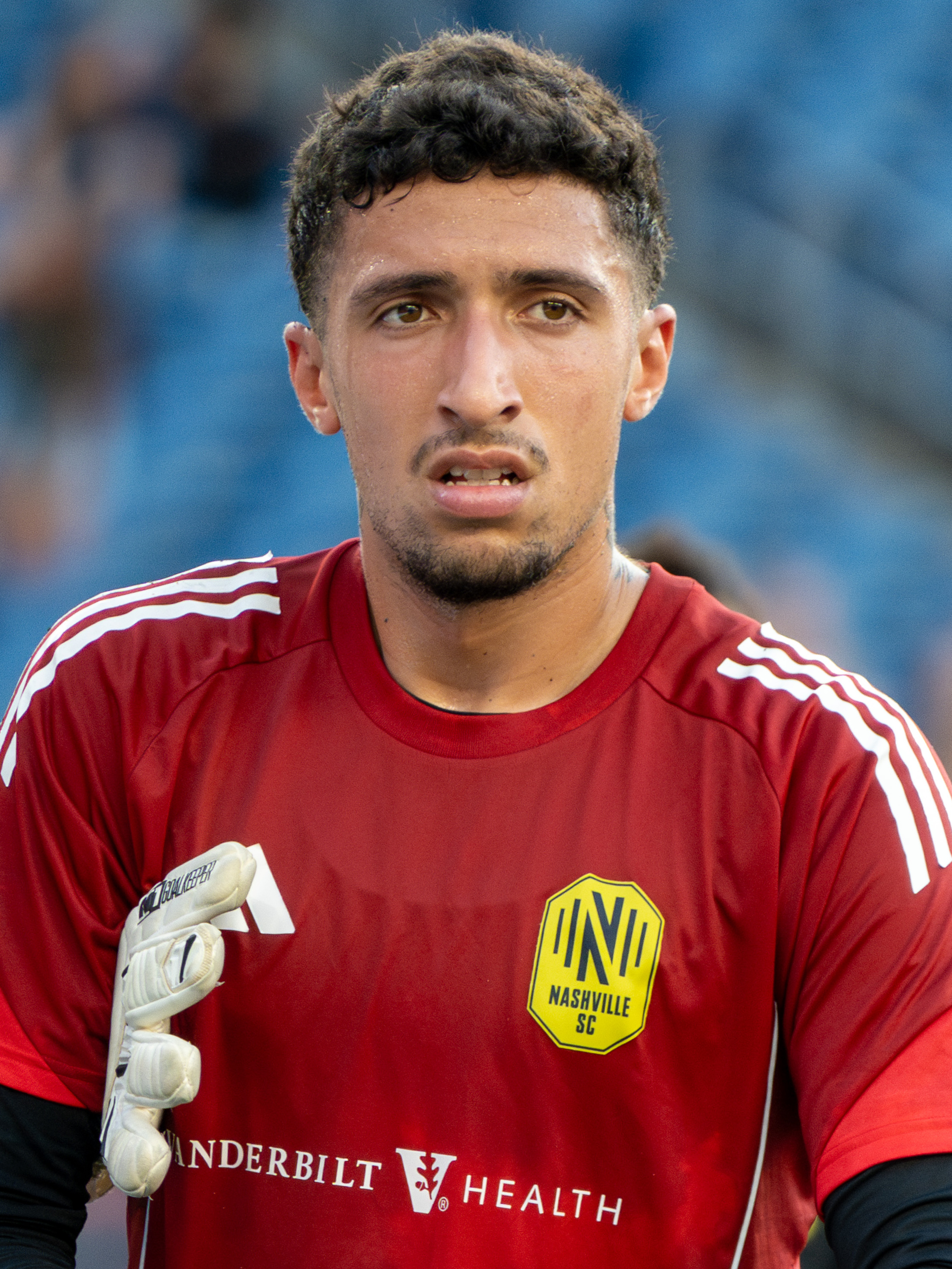
- Valdez with Nashville SC in 2025

Personal information
- Full name: Xavier William Valdez Derrig
- Date of birth: 23 November 2003 (age 22)
- Place of birth: Harlem, New York, U.S.
- Height: 1.95 m (6 ft 5 in)
- Position: Goalkeeper

Team information
- Current team: Nashville SC
- Number: 13

Youth career
- 2009–2019: Manhattan SC
- 2019–2020: Shattuck-Saint Mary's
- 2020–2022: Houston Dynamo

Senior career*
Years	Team	Apps	(Gls)
2022–2024	Houston Dynamo 2	50	(0)
2022–2024	Houston Dynamo	0	(0)
2025–	Nashville SC	0	(0)
2025–	Huntsville City FC	14	(0)

International career^{‡}
2022–2024	Dominican Republic U20	6	(0)
2024–	Dominican Republic U23	2	(0)
2023–	Dominican Republic	27	(0)
- * Club domestic league appearances and goals as of 24 August 2026 ‡ National team caps and goals as of 5 October 2026

Xavier William Valdez Derrig (born 23 November 2003) is a professional footballer who plays as a goalkeeper for Major League Soccer club Nashville SC. Born in the United States, he plays for the Dominican Republic national team.

== Club career ==
Born in New York City, Valdez began his youth career with Manhattan SC where he played as a winger, and after a growth spurt was switched to a goalkeeper. He moved to Minnesota as a sophomore in high school, and joined Shattuck-Saint Mary's where he continued playing football. After a couple of seasons there, he joined the youth academy at Houston Dynamo in July 2020. On 27 February 2022, he signed a homegrown contract with Houston Dynamo. On November 7, 2024, his contract option was declined by Houston following their 2024 season.

On 10 January 2025, Valdez signed with Nashville SC on a one-year contract with club options for both of the following two years.

== International career ==
Valdez was born in the United States to a Dominican father and American mother. In April 2022, he was called up to a training camp for the United States U20s. He played for the Dominican Republic U20s at the 2022 CONCACAF U-20 Championship, where the team finished in second place. He was also called up for the 2023 FIFA U-20 World Cup. He made his debut with the senior Dominican Republic national team in a friendly 5–0 loss to Chile on 17 June 2023.
