= 2026 Atlanta United FC season =

Atlanta United FC
2026 season
- Owner: Arthur Blank
- President: Mauricio Culebro
- Head coach: Gerardo Martino
- Stadium: Mercedes-Benz Stadium; Atlanta, Georgia
- MLS: Conference: 13th Overall: 27th
- MLS Cup playoffs: Did not qualify
- U.S. Open Cup: Quarterfinals
- Top goalscorer: League: Miguel Almirón; Aleksei Miranchuk (7 each); All: Aleksei Miranchuk (8)
Home colors	Away colors

The 2026 season was the tenth season of Atlanta United FC's existence, and the eighteenth year that a professional soccer club from Atlanta, Georgia competed in the top division of American soccer. Atlanta United played its home games at Mercedes-Benz Stadium. Outside of MLS, the club participated in the U.S. Open Cup for the first time since 2024, ultimately losing to Orlando City SC in the quarterfinals in May.

After the conclusion of its worst season in club history, Atlanta United fired head coach Ronny Deila on October 19, 2025. Less than a month later, on November 6, the club announced the hiring and return of former head coach Gerardo "Tata" Martino. Tata previously coached Atlanta United for two years, from the inaugural 2017 season to the 2018 season, in which they won the 2018 MLS Cup.

Atlanta United FC played six consecutive road matches from May to August due to their home venue, Mercedes-Benz Stadium, being unavailable during the 2026 FIFA World Cup. The regular season also paused for several weeks during the tournament.

== Club ==
Squad no.	Player	Nationality	Position(s)	Date of birth (age)	Previous club	Apps	Goals
Goalkeepers
1	Lucas Hoyos	(Argentina)	GK	April 29, 1989 (age 37)	(Argentina) Newell's Old Boys	33	0
42	Jayden Hibbert	(Canada)	GK	August 5, 2004 (age 22)	(United States) Atlanta United 2	13	0
Defenders
3	Elías Báez	(Argentina)	LB	August 18, 2004 (age 22)	(Argentina) San Lorenzo	34	1
4	Enea Mihaj	(Albania)	CB	July 5, 1998 (age 28)	(Portugal) Famalicão	36	0
6	Júnior Alonso	(Paraguay)	CB	February 9, 1993 (age 33)	(Brazil) Atlético Mineiro	18	0
27	Paulo Díaz	(Chile)	CB	August 25, 1994 (age 32)	(Argentina) River Plate	12	0
47	Matthew Edwards (HGP)	(United States)	LB	February 16, 2003 (age 23)	(United States) Atlanta United 2	50	0
50	Dominik Chong-Qui (HGP)	(United States)	LB	December 29, 2007 (age 18)	(United States) Atlanta United 2	3	0
55	Tomás Jacob	(Argentina)	RB	April 20, 2004 (age 22)	(Mexico) Necaxa	31	3
Midfielders
7	Steven Alzate	(Colombia)	CM	September 8, 1998 (age 28)	(England) Hull City	25	0
8	Tristan Muyumba	(France)	DM	March 7, 1997 (age 29)	(France) Guingamp	115	6
10	Miguel Almirón (DP)	(Paraguay)	RW	February 10, 1994 (age 32)	(England) Newcastle United	131	36
11	Giuliano Galoppo	(Argentina)	CM	June 18, 1999 (age 27)	(Argentina) River Plate	9	2
14	Mauricio Amaro	(Uruguay)	CM	July 19, 2005 (age 21)	(Uruguay) Defensor Sporting	12	0
16	Adrian Gill	(United States)	CM	January 3, 2006 (age 20)	(Spain) Barcelona B	7	0
20	Luke Brennan (HGP)	(United States)	LW	February 24, 2005 (age 21)	(United States) Atlanta United 2	50	0
22	Fafà Picault	(Haiti)	LW	February 23, 1991 (age 35)	(United States) Inter Miami	25	5
28	Will Reilly (HGP)	(United States)	CM	December 3, 2002 (age 23)	(United States) Stanford University	28	1
35	Jay Fortune (HGP)	(Trinidad and Tobago)	AM	December 30, 2002 (age 23)	(United States) Atlanta United 2	91	5
40	Santiago Pita (HGP)	(Venezuela)	AM	June 1, 2007 (age 19)	(United States) Atlanta United 2	0	0
48	Cooper Sanchez (HGP)	(United States)	CM	March 26, 2008 (age 18)	(United States) Atlanta United 2	35	2
59	Aleksei Miranchuk (DP)	(Russia)	AM	October 17, 1995 (age 31)	(Italy) Atalanta	85	19
Forwards
19	Sérgio Santos	(Brazil)	CF	September 4, 1994 (age 32)	(United States) Houston Dynamo	10	0
30	Cayman Togashi	(Japan)	CF	August 10, 1993 (age 33)	(Japan) Sagan Tosu	17	2
36	Breel Embolo (DP)	(Switzerland)	CF	February 14, 1997 (age 29)	(France) Rennes	12	4

== Player movement ==
=== In ===
No.	Pos.	Player	Transferred from	Type	US	Fee/notes	Date	Source
24	DF	(United States) Noah Cobb	(United States) Colorado Rapids	Loan Return	US		December 9, 2025	
1	GK	(Argentina) Lucas Hoyos	(Argentina) Newell's Old Boys	Transfer	Non-US	Free	December 23, 2025	
55	DF	(Argentina) Tomás Jacob	(Mexico) Necaxa	Transfer	Non-US	$5,000,000	December 30, 2025	
—	DF	(United States) Kaiden Moore	(United States) Atlanta United 2	Transfer	US	Homegrown Contract	January 1, 2026	
40	MF	(Venezuela) Santiago Pita	(United States) Atlanta United 2	Transfer	US	Homegrown Contract	January 1, 2026	
70	MF	(Colombia) Edwin Mosquera	(Colombia) Millonarios	Loan Return	Non-US	Early Loan Termination	January 15, 2026	
16	MF	(United States) Adrian Gill	(Spain) Barcelona B	Transfer	US	Free	January 27, 2026	
3	DF	(Argentina) Elías Báez	(Argentina) San Lorenzo	Transfer	US	$3,000,000	February 3, 2026	
22	MF	(Haiti) Fafà Picault	(United States) Inter Miami	Transfer	US	Free	February 17, 2026	
19	FW	(Brazil) Sérgio Santos	(United States) Houston Dynamo	Transfer	Non-US	Free	February 18, 2026	
6	DF	(Paraguay) Júnior Alonso	(Brazil) Atlético Mineiro	Transfer	Non-US	Free	July 13, 2026	
27	DF	(Chile) Paulo Díaz	(Argentina) River Plate	Transfer	Non-US	Free	July 14, 2026	
14	MF	(Uruguay) Mauricio Amaro	(Uruguay) Defensor Sporting	Transfer	Non-US	$3,000,000	August 7, 2026	
36	FW	(Switzerland) Breel Embolo	(France) Rennes	Transfer	Non-US	$18,000,000	August 23, 2026	

=== Out ===
No.	Pos.	Player	Transferred to	Type	US	Fee/notes	Date	Source
1	GK	(United States) Brad Guzan	Retired		US		October 19, 2025	
11	DF	(United States) Brooks Lennon	(United States) Columbus Crew	Option Declined	US	Free	November 18, 2025	
13	MF	(Brazil) Leo Afonso	(United States) Rhode Island FC	Option Declined	US	Free	November 18, 2025	
22	GK	(United States) Josh Cohen	(United States) Chicago Fire	Option Declined	US	Free	November 18, 2025	
66	DF	(United States) Nyk Sessock	(United States) Las Vegas Lights	Option Declined	US	Free	November 18, 2025	
24	DF	(United States) Noah Cobb	(United States) Colorado Rapids	Transfer	US	$525,000 GAM	December 9, 2025	
99	MF	(Poland) Bartosz Slisz	(Denmark) Brøndby	Transfer	Non-US	$3,500,000	January 8, 2026	
70	MF	(Colombia) Edwin Mosquera	(Colombia) Santa Fe	Transfer	Non-US	Undisclosed	January 18, 2026	
14	FW	(Senegal) Jamal Thiaré	(United States) Columbus Crew	Transfer	Non-US	$300,000 GAM	February 2, 2026	
11	MF	(Georgia (country)) Saba Lobzhanidze	(United States) Real Salt Lake	Transfer	Non-US	$650,000 GAM	July 1, 2026	
18	DF	(Portugal) Pedro Amador	(Israel) Hapoel Be'er Sheva	Transfer	Non-US	Undisclosed	July 30, 2026	
5	DF	(Norway) Stian Gregersen	(Sweden) Malmö FF	Transfer	Non-US	Undisclosed	August 27, 2026	
2	DF	(Venezuela) Ronald Hernández	(United States) Portland Timbers	Transfer	Non-US	$150,000 GAM	September 2, 2026	

==== In on loan ====
No.	Pos.	Player	Loaned From	US	Start	End	Source
6	DF	(Spain) Juan Berrocal	(Spain) Getafe	Non-US	July 25, 2025	June 30, 2026	
88	MF	(Paraguay) Matías Galarza	(Argentina) River Plate	Non-US	March 2, 2026	June 30, 2026	
11	MF	(Argentina) Giuliano Galoppo	(Argentina) River Plate	Non-US	September 2, 2026	June 30, 2027	

==== Out on loan ====
No.	Pos.	Player	Loaned to	Start	End	Source
27	MF	(Jamaica) Ashton Gordon	(United States) Chattanooga FC	January 7, 2026	December 31, 2026	
—	DF	(United States) Kaiden Moore	(United States) Philadelphia Union	January 21, 2026	December 31, 2026	
9	FW	(Ivory Coast) Emmanuel Latte Lath	(Germany) Union Berlin	August 2, 2026	June 30, 2027	
23	MF	(Puerto Rico) Adyn Torres	(Estonia) Nõmme United	August 21, 2026	December 31, 2026	

==== SuperDraft picks ====
2026 Atlanta United SuperDraft Picks
Round	Selection	Player	Position	College
1	12	(Togo) Enzo Dovlo	MF	UNCG
3	62	(United States) Noah James	MF	San Diego

== Competitions ==
=== Overview ===
Competition	Starting round	Final position	Record							
Competition	Starting round	Final position	Pld	W	D	L	GF	GA	GD	Win %
Major League Soccer	Matchday 1	14th (East)	34	9	6	19	43	60	−17	26.47
U.S. Open Cup	Round of 32	Quarterfinals	3	2	0	1	6	5	+1	66.67
Total			37	11	6	20	49	65	−16	29.73

Last updated: November 9, 2026

Win Draw Loss

=== Non-competitive ===
Atlanta United announced their preseason schedule on January 6.

==== Pre-season exhibitions ====
January 30 1	Atlanta United FC	4–0	Lexington SC	Marietta, GA
11:00 AM EST	Miranchuk 11', 42'; Almirón 32', 37'	Report		Stadium: Children's Healthcare of Atlanta Training Ground

February 7 2	Houston Dynamo	1–1 (4–3 p)	Atlanta United FC	Houston, TX
8:00 PM EST	Halter 50'	Report	Latte Lath 38'	Stadium: Shell Energy Stadium
	Penalties
	Markanich (penalty scored); Lingr (penalty scored); Holmes (penalty missed); Negri (penalty scored); Wiesner (penalty scored)		(penalty scored) Berrocal; (penalty scored) Pita; (penalty missed) Brennan; (penalty missed) Gill; (penalty scored) Togashi

February 11 3	New York Red Bulls	2–3	Atlanta United FC	Frisco, TX
12:00 PM EST	Ruvalcaba 17'; Hall 36'	Report	63' (o.g.); 65' (o.g.); Latte Lath 76'	Stadium: Toyota Stadium

February 14 4	FC Dallas	–	Atlanta United FC	Frisco, TX
1:00 PM EST				Stadium: Toyota Stadium
Note: Canceled due to inclement weather.

=== MLS ===
==== Standings ====
===== Eastern Conference =====
MLS Eastern Conference table (2026)
Pos	Team	Pld	W	L	T	GF	GA	GD	Pts
11	New York City FC	34	10	12	12	49	45	+4	42
12	Toronto FC	34	9	13	12	52	67	−15	39
13	Atlanta United FC	34	9	19	6	43	60	−17	33
14	D.C. United	34	7	15	12	39	61	−22	33
15	CF Montréal	34	6	20	8	37	69	−32	26

Source: MLS
Rules for classification: 1) points; 2) total wins; 3) total goal differential; 4) total goals scored; 5) fewer disciplinary points; 6) away goal differential; 7) away goals scored; 8) home goals differential; 9) home goals scored; 10) coin toss (2 clubs tied) or drawing of lots (≥3 clubs tied)

===== Overall =====
Overall MLS standings table
Pos	Team	Pld	W	L	T	GF	GA	GD	Pts
25	San Diego FC	34	9	14	11	57	63	−6	38
26	Austin FC	34	8	16	10	42	65	−23	34
27	Atlanta United FC	34	9	19	6	43	60	−17	33
28	D.C. United	34	7	15	12	39	61	−22	33
29	Sporting Kansas City	34	7	22	5	40	81	−41	26

Source: MLS
Rules for classification: 1) points; 2) total wins; 3) total goal differential; 4) total goals scored; 5) fewer disciplinary points; 6) away goal differential; 7) away goals scored; 8) home goals differential; 9) home goals scored; 10) coin toss (2 clubs tied) or drawing of lots (≥3 clubs tied)

==== Results by round ====
Round	1	2	3	4	5	6	7	8	9	10	11	12	13	14	15	16	17	18	19	20	21	22	23	24	25	26	27	28	29	30	31	32	33	34
Stadium	A	A	H	H	H	H	A	H	H	A	H	H	A	A	A	A	A	A	H	A	H	H	A	H	A	A	H	H	A	H	H	A	H	A
Result	L	L	L	W	D	L	L	L	L	W	W	L	D	L	L	D	L	L	W	W	W	L	D	L	D	W	D	L	W	L	L	L	W	L
Position (East)	12	14	14	10	10	12	12	14	15	13	12	13	14	14	14	14	15	15	15	15	12	13	14	14	14	14	14	14	14	14	14	14	14	13

Source: MLS standings
A = Away; H = Home; W = Win; D = Draw; L = Loss; P = Postponed

==== Matches ====
February 21 1	FC Cincinnati	2–0	Atlanta United FC	Cincinnati, Ohio
4:45 p.m. EST	Ramírez (yellow card) 26'; Denkey 80'; Hagglund 90'	Report	Jacob (yellow card) 51'; Alzate (yellow card) 61'	Stadium: TQL Stadium; Attendance: 25,513; Referee: Rosendo Mendoza

February 28 2	San Jose Earthquakes	2–0	Atlanta United FC	San Jose, California
7:30 PM	Judd 24'; Bouda 79'; Jones (yellow card) 90'	Report	Latte Lath (yellow card) 16'; Sanchez (yellow card) 39'; Hernández (yellow card) 52'	Stadium: PayPal Park; Attendance: 16,159; Referee: Ricardo Fierro

March 7 3	Atlanta United FC	2–3	Real Salt Lake	Atlanta, Georgia
7:30 PM	Miranchuk 38', 74'; Sanchez (yellow card) 43'; Berrocal (yellow card) 45+6'	Report	Hezarkhani (yellow card) 17', (goal) 27'; Solans 23'; Gozo 40', (yellow card) 90+1'; Moisa (yellow card) 44'	Stadium: Mercedes-Benz Stadium; Attendance: 53,862; Referee: Jon Freemon

March 14 4	Atlanta United FC	3–1	Philadelphia Union	Atlanta, Georgia
3:00 PM	Latte Lath 28'; Báez (yellow card) 41'; Gregersen (yellow card) 45+2'; Jacob 47', (yellow card) 85'; Galarza (yellow card) 49'; Miranchuk 68'	Report	Anello 87'	Stadium: Mercedes-Benz Stadium; Attendance: 35,308; Referee: Marcos de Oliveira

March 21 5	Atlanta United FC	0–0	D.C. United	Atlanta, Georgia
7:30 PM	Muyumba (yellow card) 60'	Report	Bartlett (yellow card) 68'	Stadium: Mercedes-Benz Stadium; Attendance: 35,418; Referee: Jair Marrufo

April 4 6	Atlanta United FC	1–3	Columbus Crew	Atlanta, Georgia
7:30 PM	Miranchuk 60'; Mihaj (yellow card) 90'; Báez (yellow card) 90+2'	Report	Abou Ali 48', 53'; Arfsten 61'; Chambost (yellow card) 90+4'	Stadium: Mercedes-Benz Stadium; Attendance: 34,130; Referee: Lorenzo Hernandez

April 11 7	Chicago Fire FC	1–0	Atlanta United FC	Chicago, Illinois
8:30 PM	Zinckernagel (yellow card) 8'; Haile-Selassie 13'; Barroso (yellow card) 48'	Report	Jacob (yellow card) 3'	Stadium: Soldier Field; Attendance: 17,764; Referee: Drew Fischer

April 18 8	Atlanta United FC	0–2	Nashville SC	Atlanta, Georgia
7:30 PM	Muyumba (yellow card) 45+1'; Hoyos (yellow card) 76'	Report	Espinoza 61'; Mohammed 90+1'	Stadium: Mercedes-Benz Stadium; Attendance: 36,895; Referee: Allen Chapman

April 22 9	Atlanta United FC	1–2	New England Revolution	Atlanta, Georgia
7:30 PM	Picault 38'; Galarza (yellow card) 44'; Edwards (yellow card) 47'	Report	Sands 73'; Miller 78'; Raines (yellow card) 87'; Feingold (yellow card) 90+2'	Stadium: Mercedes-Benz Stadium; Attendance: 30,306; Referee: Ricardo Montero

April 25 10	Toronto FC	1–2	Atlanta United FC	Toronto, Ontario
1:00 PM	Aristizábal 71'	Report	Gregersen (yellow card) 38'; Sanchez (yellow card) 45+2'; Miranchuk 48'; Muyumba 67'	Stadium: BMO Field; Attendance: 13,754; Referee: Ismail Elfath

May 2 11	Atlanta United FC	3–1	CF Montréal	Atlanta, Georgia
7:30 PM	Latte Lath (yellow card) 4', (goal) 45+6'; Lobjanidze 41', 50'; Hoyos (yellow card) 78'; Mihaj (yellow card) 90+2'; Jacob (yellow card) 90+5'	Report	Longstaff 6'; Piette (yellow card) 20'; Owusu (yellow card) 44'; Vera (red card) 90+1'; Ríos (yellow card) 90+2'	Stadium: Mercedes-Benz Stadium; Attendance: 34,703; Referee: Rubiel Vazquez

May 9 12	Atlanta United FC	1–2	LA Galaxy	Atlanta, Georgia
7:30 PM	Gregersen (yellow card) 26'; Sanchez (yellow card) 28'; Berrocal (yellow card) 30'; Fortune 69'	Report	Glesnes (yellow card) 53'; Pec 74', 79'	Stadium: Mercedes-Benz Stadium; Attendance: 40,392; Referee: Fotis Bazakos

May 16 13	Orlando City SC	1–1	Atlanta United FC	Orlando, Florida
7:30 PM	Dorsey 18'; Pašalić (yellow card) 28'; Crépeau (yellow card) 85'	Report	Reilly (yellow card) 41'; Fortune 86'	Stadium: Inter&Co Stadium; Attendance: 20,074; Referee: Tori Penso

May 24 14	Columbus Crew	2–0	Atlanta United FC	Columbus, Ohio
5:00 PM	Zawadzki (yellow card) 23'; Bangoura 24', (yellow card) 64'; Rossi 45+2'; Camacho (yellow card) 90+4'	Report	Báez (yellow card) 50'; Mihaj (yellow card) 90+3'; Muyumba (yellow card) 90+4'	Stadium: ScottsMiracle-Gro Field; Attendance: 19,782; Referee: Chris Penso

July 17 15	Nashville SC	1–0	Atlanta United FC	Nashville, Tennessee
8:00 PM	Mohammed 79', (yellow card) 85'	Report	Mihaj (yellow card) 90+10'	Stadium: Geodis Park; Attendance: 30,109; Referee: Filip Dujic

July 22 16	Charlotte FC	2–2	Atlanta United FC	Charlotte, North Carolina
8:00 PM	Vargas 16'; Abada 45'; Byrne (yellow card) 79'	Report	Reilly (yellow card) 22'; Miranchuk (yellow card) 48'; Báez 57'; Almirón 76'; Jacob (yellow card) 90+10'	Stadium: Bank of America Stadium; Attendance: 28,077; Referee: Sergii Boiko

July 25 17	New England Revolution	4–1	Atlanta United FC	Foxborough, Massachusetts
7:30 PM	Gil 11'; Yusuf (yellow card) 20'; Turgeman 36'; Miller 56'; Raines 67'; Harris (yellow card) 70'	Report	Edwards (yellow card) 31'; Reilly (yellow card) 52'; Almirón 76'	Stadium: Gillette Stadium; Attendance: 34,428; Referee: Pierre-Luc Lauziere

August 1 18	Philadelphia Union	3–2	Atlanta United FC	Chester, Pennsylvania
7:30 PM	Iloski (yellow card) 28', (goal) 73'; Harriel (yellow card) 53'; Damiani (yellow card) 68'; Pierre 90+6'; Alladoh 90+7'	Report	Mihaj (red card) 26'; Almirón 30'; Hoyos (yellow card) 59'; Muyumba 66'; Báez (yellow card) 90+2'	Stadium: Subaru Park; Attendance: 18,557; Referee: Allen Chapman

August 15 19	Atlanta United FC	2–1	New York Red Bulls	Atlanta, Georgia
7:30 PM	Jacob (yellow card) 48'; Muyumba 69'; Picault 82', (yellow card) 83'; Báez (yellow card) 84'	Report	Forsberg 6'; Sofo (yellow card) 90+5'	Stadium: Mercedes-Benz Stadium; Attendance: 38,469; Referee: Marcos de Oliveira

August 19 20	Minnesota United FC	1–2	Atlanta United FC	Saint Paul, Minnesota
8:30 PM	Boxall (yellow card) 29'; Pereyra (yellow card) 32'; Markanich 58'; Chancalay (yellow card) 75'; Gene (yellow card) 87'	Report	Alonso (yellow card) 19'; Jacob 37'; Gill (yellow card) 46'; Sanchez (yellow card) 57'; Muyumba 78'	Stadium: Allianz Field; Attendance: 19,210; Referee: Joshua Encarnación

August 23 21	Atlanta United FC	2–1	Sporting Kansas City	Atlanta, Georgia
7:00 PM	Jacob 13'; Picault 24'; Brennan (yellow card) 72'; Báez (yellow card) 76'	Report	Karić (yellow card) 22'; Afrifa 70'	Stadium: Mercedes-Benz Stadium; Attendance: 36,626; Referee: Tori Penso

August 29 22	Atlanta United FC	0–2	Charlotte FC	Atlanta, Georgia
7:30 PM	Gill (yellow card) 85'	Report	Toklomati 22'; Diani (yellow card) 45+3'; Abada 48'	Stadium: Mercedes-Benz Stadium; Attendance: 40,385; Referee: Victor Rivas

September 5 23	Inter Miami CF	2–2	Atlanta United FC	Miami, Florida
7:30 PM	Falcón (yellow card) 28'; Casemiro 32', (yellow card) 72'; Berterame (yellow card) 42'; Suárez 45+1'; Caicedo (yellow card) 58'; St. Clair (yellow card) 62'; De Paul (yellow card) 75'	Report	Almirón 35', (penalty missed) 73'; Sanchez (yellow card) 39'; Paulo Díaz (yellow card) 47'; Embolo 87' (pen.)	Stadium: Nu Stadium; Attendance: 26,635; Referee: Jon Freemon

September 9 24	Atlanta United FC	2–3	Orlando City SC	Atlanta, Georgia
7:30 PM	Brekalo 7' (o.g.); Jacob (yellow card) 67'; Spicer 90+7' (o.g.)	Report	Griezmann 26', 77'; Brekalo (yellow card) 42'; Angulo 58'; Ellis (yellow card) 88'	Stadium: Mercedes-Benz Stadium; Attendance: 33,025; Referee: Armando Villarreal

September 12 25	D.C. United	0–0	Atlanta United FC	Washington, D.C.
7:30 PM	Rowles (yellow card) 68'; Nono (yellow card) 70'; Sroud (yellow card) 71'	Report	Amaro (yellow card) 36'; Muyumba (yellow card) 62'	Stadium: Audi Field; Attendance: 14,189; Referee: Malik Badawi

September 19 26	Portland Timbers	0–1	Atlanta United FC	Portland, Oregon
10:30 PM	Chará (yellow card) 25'; Waterman (yellow card) 45+1'	Report	Miranchuk 28'; Galoppo (yellow card) 45+1'; Muyumba (yellow card) 64'	Stadium: Providence Park; Attendance: 22,874; Referee: Ismail Elfath

September 26 27	Atlanta United FC	2–2	New York City FC	Atlanta, Georgia
7:30 PM	Galoppo 10'; Brennan (yellow card) 43'; Fortune 74'	Report	Edwards 5' (o.g.); Perea 56'; Gustavo (yellow card) 90+5'	Stadium: Mercedes-Benz Stadium; Attendance: 37,478; Referee: Alexis Da Silva

October 10 28	Atlanta United FC	1–3	FC Cincinnati	Atlanta, Georgia
7:30 PM	Jacob (yellow card) 43'; Almirón 69'; Amaro (yellow card) 90+4'	Report	Hadebe (yellow card) 2'; Denkey 52', 90+7'; Barlow 84', (yellow card) 90+4'; Malatini (yellow card) 88'	Stadium: Mercedes-Benz Stadium; Attendance: 36,286; Referee: Fotis Bazakos

October 14 29	CF Montréal	0–3	Atlanta United FC	Montreal, Quebec
7:30 PM	Escobar (yellow card) 83'	Report	Almirón 22'; Galoppo 41'; Hoyos (yellow card) 58'; Embolo 60'; Picault (yellow card) 90+1'	Stadium: Saputo Stadium; Attendance: 12,022; Referee: Pierre-Luc Lauziere

October 17 30	Atlanta United FC	1–3	Inter Miami CF	Atlanta, Georgia
7:30 PM	Jacob (yellow card) 44'; Amaro (yellow card) 54'; Embolo (yellow card) 71'; Picault 89' (pen.)	Report	Berterame 45'; Messi 56', 60', (yellow card) 90+6'; Falcón (yellow card) 89'	Stadium: Mercedes-Benz Stadium; Attendance: 46,686; Referee: Allen Chapman

October 24 31	Atlanta United FC	2–3	Chicago Fire FC	Atlanta, Georgia
7:30 PM	Jacob 4'; Hoyos (yellow card) 59'; Embolo 68'; Díaz (yellow card) 74'; Alonso (yellow card) 84'	Report	Salétros 30'; D'Avilla (yellow card) 38'; Mekvabishvili 51', (yellow card) 79'; Zinckernagel 60'; Mbokazi (yellow card) 81'; Gomez (yellow card) 84'	Stadium: Mercedes-Benz Stadium; Attendance: 40,026; Referee: Victor Rivas

October 28 32	New York City FC	2–1	Atlanta United FC	New York, New York
7:30 PM	Gray (yellow card) 7'; Talles Magno (yellow card) 43'; Fernández 70'; Traoré 90+5'	Report	Amaro (yellow card) 11'; Díaz (yellow card) 34'; Muyumba (yellow card) 68'; Edwards (yellow card) 81'; Embolo 88'	Stadium: Citi Field; Referee: Tori Penso

November 1 33	Atlanta United FC	3–1	Toronto FC	Atlanta, Georgia
3:30 PM	Almirón 22'; Sanchez 40'; Miranchuk 51'	Report	Sallói (yellow card) 33'; Morgan 79'; Coello (yellow card) 90+2'	Stadium: Mercedes-Benz Stadium; Attendance: 41,197; Referee: Filip Dujic

November 7 34	New York Red Bulls	3–0	Atlanta United FC	Harrison, New Jersey
4:00 PM	Mehmeti 31'; Cowell 54'; Bazán (yellow card) 75'; Marshall-Rutty 82'	Report	Galoppo (yellow card) 68'	Stadium: Sports Illustrated Stadium; Attendance: 23,826; Referee: Pierre-Luc Lauzière

=== U.S. Open Cup ===
On December 4, 2025 Atlanta United announced their participation in the U.S. Open Cup for the first time since 2024. They entered the tournament in the Round of 32, which took place on April 15.

April 15 Round of 32	Chattanooga FC (Tennessee)	1–3	(Georgia (U.S. state)) Atlanta United FC	Chattanooga, Tennessee
7:30 PM	Tcheuyap 6'; Robertson (yellow card) 78'	Report	Togashi 21'; Edwards (yellow card) 23'; Picault 64'; Amador 75'; Brennan (yellow card) 78'	Stadium: Finley Stadium; Attendance: 5,292; Referee: Igor Bych

April 28 Round of 16	Charlotte FC (North Carolina)	0–2	(Georgia (U.S. state)) Atlanta United FC	Matthews, North Carolina
7:00 PM	Vargas (yellow card) 90+2'	Report	Miranchuk 22'; Sanchez 71', (yellow card) 90'; Brennan (yellow card) 90+2'	Stadium: Sportsplex at Matthews; Attendance: 3,315; Referee: Sergii Boiko

May 19 Quarterfinals	Orlando City SC (Florida)	4–1	(Georgia (U.S. state)) Atlanta United FC	Orlando, Florida
7:30 PM	Brekalo 5'; Dorsey 16'; Tiago 24', 45+5'; Cartagena (yellow card) 90+2'	Report	Gregersen (yellow card) 45+4'; Sanchez (yellow card) 64'; Muyumba (yellow card) 67'; Latte Lath 84'; Amador (yellow card) 89'; Santos (yellow card) 90+2'	Stadium: Inter&Co Stadium; Attendance: 14,254; Referee: Lorenzo Hernandez

== Statistics ==
=== Top scorers ===
As of November 9, 2026

Place	Position	Name	MLS	Playoffs	U.S. Open Cup	Total
1	MF	(Russia) Aleksei Miranchuk	7	0	1	8
2	MF	(Paraguay) Miguel Almirón	7	0	0	7
3	MF	(Haiti) Fafa Picault	4	0	1	5
4	FW	(Switzerland) Breel Embolo	4	0	0	4
4	DF	(Argentina) Tomás Jacob	4	0	0	4
4	MF	(France) Tristan Muyumba	4	0	0	4
7	MF	(Trinidad and Tobago) Jay Fortune	3	0	0	3
7	MF	(Ivory Coast) Emmanuel Latte Lath	2	0	1	3
9	MF	(Argentina) Giuliano Galoppo	2	0	0	2
9	MF	(Georgia (country)) Saba Lobzhanidze	2	0	0	2
9	MF	(United States) Cooper Sanchez	1	0	1	2
12	DF	(Portugal) Pedro Amador	0	0	1	1
12	DF	(Argentina) Elías Báez	1	0	0	1
12	FW	(Japan) Cayman Togashi	0	0	1	1
Own Goals			2	0	0	2
Total			43	0	6	49

=== Appearances and goals ===
As of November 9, 2026

No.	Pos	Player	Nat	MLS			Playoffs			Open Cup			Total		
No.	Pos	Player	Nat	App	St	G	App	St	G	App	St	G	App	St	G
Goalkeepers
1	GK	Lucas Hoyos	(Argentina)	33	33	0	0	0	0	0	0	0	33	33	0
42	GK	Jayden Hibbert	(Canada)	1	1	0	0	0	0	3	3	0	4	4	0
Defenders
3	DF	Elías Báez	(Argentina)	31	30	1	0	0	0	3	2	0	34	32	1
4	DF	Enea Mihaj	(Albania)	23	18	0	0	0	0	1	1	0	24	19	0
6	DF	Júnior Alonso	(Paraguay)	18	18	0	0	0	0	0	0	0	18	18	0
27	DF	Paulo Díaz	(Chile)	12	11	0	0	0	0	0	0	0	12	11	0
44	DF	Daniel Chica (Note: Signed on a short term loan from Atlanta United 2 on September 25)	(United States)	1	0	0	0	0	0	0	0	0	1	0	0
47	DF	Matthew Edwards	(United States)	23	10	0	0	0	0	2	2	0	25	12	0
55	DF	Tomás Jacob	(Argentina)	30	30	3	0	0	0	1	1	0	31	31	3
—	DF	Pedro Amador (Note: Transferred to Hapoel Be'er Sheva on July 30)	(Portugal)	7	2	0	0	0	0	2	1	1	9	3	1
—	DF	Juan Berrocal (Note: Returned from loan back to Getafe CF on July 1)	(Spain)	9	8	0	0	0	0	3	2	0	12	10	0
—	DF	Stian Gregersen (Note: Transferred to Malmö FF on August 27)	(Norway)	15	10	0	0	0	0	1	1	0	16	11	0
—	DF	Ronald Hernández (Note: Transferred to Portland Timbers on September 2)	(Venezuela)	7	2	0	0	0	0	0	0	0	7	2	0
Midfielders
7	MF	Steven Alzate	(Colombia)	15	4	0	0	0	0	0	0	0	15	4	0
8	MF	Tristan Muyumba	(France)	34	27	4	0	0	0	3	0	0	37	27	4
10	MF	Miguel Almirón	(Paraguay)	27	26	7	0	0	0	1	0	0	28	26	7
11	MF	Giuliano Galoppo	(Argentina)	9	9	2	0	0	0	0	0	0	9	9	2
14	MF	Mauricio Amaro	(Uruguay)	12	11	0	0	0	0	0	0	0	12	11	0
16	MF	Adrian Gill	(United States)	7	3	0	0	0	0	0	0	0	7	3	0
20	MF	Luke Brennan	(United States)	20	4	0	0	0	0	2	1	0	22	5	0
22	MF	Fafà Picault	(Haiti)	23	8	4	0	0	0	2	2	1	25	10	5
28	MF	Will Reilly	(United States)	11	8	0	0	0	0	3	3	0	14	11	0
35	MF	Jay Fortune	(Trinidad and Tobago)	19	10	3	0	0	0	3	3	0	22	13	3
48	MF	Cooper Sanchez	(United States)	29	23	1	0	0	0	3	1	1	32	24	2
56	MF	Ignacio Suarez (Note: Signed on a short term loan from Atlanta United 2 on July 22)	(United States)	1	0	0	0	0	0	0	0	0	1	0	0
59	MF	Aleksei Miranchuk	(Russia)	32	29	7	0	0	0	3	3	1	35	32	8
67	MF	Enzo Dovlo (Note: Signed on a short term loan from Atlanta United 2 on August 28)	(Togo)	1	0	0	0	0	0	0	0	0	1	0	0
70	MF	Cameron Dunbar (Note: Signed on a short term loan from Atlanta United 2 on September 25)	(United States)	1	0	0	0	0	0	0	0	0	1	0	0
—	MF	Matías Galarza (Note: Returned from loan back to River Plate on July 1)	(Paraguay)	10	8	0	0	0	0	3	2	0	13	10	0
—	MF	Saba Lobzhanidze (Note: Transferred to Real Salt Lake on July 1)	(Georgia (country))	13	8	2	0	0	0	1	0	0	14	8	2
Forwards
19	FW	Sérgio Santos	(Brazil)	9	0	0	0	0	0	1	0	0	10	0	0
30	FW	Cayman Togashi	(Japan)	7	1	0	0	0	0	1	1	1	8	2	1
36	FW	Breel Embolo	(Switzerland)	12	12	4	0	0	0	0	0	0	12	12	4
39	FW	Arif Kovač (Note: Signed on a short term loan from Atlanta United 2 on August 1)	(United States)	1	0	0	0	0	0	0	0	0	1	0	0
—	FW	Emmanuel Latte Lath (Note: Loaned to Union Berlin on August 2)	(Ivory Coast)	14	10	2	0	0	0	2	1	1	16	11	3
Total				28		33	0		0	3		6	31		39
