= 2025 Atlanta United 2 season =

Atlanta United 2
2025 season
- Owner: Arthur Blank
- President: Garth Lagerwey
- Head coach: Jose Silva Caparros (interim)
- Stadium: Fifth Third Bank Stadium
- MLS Next Pro Playoffs: Did Not Qualify
Home colors	Away colors
- All statistics correct as of October 5, 2025.

The 2025 Atlanta United 2 season was the team's eighth year of existence as well as their third season in MLS Next Pro, the third tier of the American soccer pyramid. On July 23rd, it was announced that, effective immediately, head coach Steve Cooke would be leaving Atlanta to become the new head coach of Birmingham Legion FC. Assistant coach Jose Silva then took over as interim head coach. Despite a good spell of games during the final stretch of the season playing under interim head coach Silva, Atlanta United 2 fell just short of making their first-ever playoff appearance.

== Club ==
Squad no.	Name	Nationality	Position(s)	Date of birth (age)	Previous club	Apps	Goals
Contracted Players
33	Patrick Weah	(Liberia)	FW	December 15, 2003 (age 22)	(United States) Minnesota United	24	9
36	Ryan Carmichael	(Northern Ireland)	FW	August 3, 2001 (age 24)	(United States) Inter Miami II	28	1
38	Ronan Wynne	(New Zealand)	DF	May 28, 2001 (age 24)	(United States) University of Denver	28	1
39	Arif Kovac	(United States)	FW	September 8, 2006 (age 19)	Academy	3	1
40	Santiago Pita	(United States)	MF	June 1, 2007 (age 18)	Academy	12	2
41	Toto Majub	(Uganda)	DF	December 19, 2005 (age 20)	(Uganda) Amusi Football Club	12	1
55	Salvatore Mazzaferro	(Canada)	DF	October 11, 2001 (age 24)	(United States) Austin FC II	27	3
56	Ignacio Suarez	(United States)	MF	April 3, 2009 (age 17)	Academy	5	1
60	James Donaldson	(United States)	GK	March 20, 2009 (age 17)	Academy	0	0
77	Rodrigo Neri	(United States)	FW	May 12, 2005 (age 20)	(Spain) Valencia Academy	37	9
80	Moises Tablante	(Venezuela)	MF	July 4, 2001 (age 24)	(United States) FC Cincinnati 2	27	5
86	Javier Armas	(Spain)	MF	January 13, 2000 (age 26)	(United States) Oregon State University	53	10
95	Kaiden Moore (Note: Loaned to Philadelphia Union II during the season.)	(United States)	DF	May 11, 2007 (age 18)	Academy	23	1
Players Loaned From Atlanta United
2	Ronald Hernández	(Venezuela)	DF	September 21, 1997 (age 28)	(Scotland) Aberdeen	6	0
13	Leo Afonso	(Brazil)	MF	July 13, 2001 (age 24)	Inter Miami	2	1
20	Luke Brennan	(United States)	MF	February 24, 2005 (age 21)	Academy	71	12
21	Efrain Morales (Note: transferred to CF Montréal during the season.)	(Bolivia)	DF	March 4, 2004 (age 22)	Academy	74	3
22	Josh Cohen	(United States)	GK	August 18, 1992 (age 33)	(Israel) Maccabi Haifa	7	0
23	Adyn Torres	(United States)	MF	November 13, 2007 (age 18)	Academy	54	0
24	Noah Cobb (Note: Loaned to Colorado Rapids during the season.)	(United States)	DF	July 20, 2005 (age 20)	Academy	61	3
27	Ashton Gordon	(Jamaica)	FW	April 14, 2007 (age 19)	Academy	19	2
28	Will Reilly	(United States)	MF	December 3, 2002 (age 23)	(United States) Stanford University	41	0
30	Cayman Togashi	(Japan)	FW	August 10, 1993 (age 32)	(Japan) Sagan Tosu	8	3
42	Jayden Hibbert	(Canada)	GK	August 5, 2004 (age 21)	(United States) UConn	29	0
48	Cooper Sanchez	(United States)	MF	March 26, 2008 (age 18)	Academy	28	1
50	Dominik Chong-Qui	(United States)	DF	December 29, 2007 (age 18)	Academy	35	2
66	Nyk Sessock	(United States)	DF	June 17, 2000 (age 25)	(United States) Inter Miami II	17	0
Academy Call-Ups
51	Jonathan Ransom	(Canada)	GK	January 8, 2008 (age 18)	Academy	15	0
61	Braden Dunham	(United States)	DF	March 10, 2007 (age 19)	Academy	9	0
71	Seamus Streelman	(United States)	DF	December 27, 2006 (age 19)	Academy	1	0
72	Ilan Ettinger	(United States)	DF	June 6, 2008 (age 17)	Academy	1	0
73	Ayo Akintobi	(United States)	DF	August 16, 2007 (age 18)	Academy	1	0
78	Isaiah Vicentti	(Puerto Rico)	DF	March 28, 2008 (age 18)	Academy	3	0
81	David Sibrian	(El Salvador)	MF	November 5, 2009 (age 16)	Academy	12	0
83	Gabriel Wesseh	(United States)	MF	May 6, 2008 (age 17)	Academy	23	4
87	Reuben Clarson	(United States)	GK	November 30, 2006 (age 19)	Academy	1	0

== Player movement ==
=== In ===
No.	Pos.	Age	Player	Transferred from	Type	Notes	Date	Source
50	DF	18	(United States) Dominik Chong-Qui	(United States) Atlanta United Academy	Transfer		January 1, 2025	
36	FW	24	(Northern Ireland) Ryan Carmichael	(United States) Inter Miami II	Transfer	Free	January 24, 2025	
33	FW	22	(Liberia) Patrick Weah	(United States) Minnesota United	Transfer	Free	January 24, 2025	
80	MF	24	(Venezuela) Moises Tablante	(United States) FC Cincinnati 2	Transfer	Free	January 24, 2025	
55	DF	24	(Canada) Salvatore Mazzaferro	(United States) Austin FC II	Transfer	Free	January 24, 2025	
47	DF	20	(Uganda) Toto Majub	(Uganda) Amusi Football Club	Transfer	Free	January 24, 2025	
39	FW	19	(United States) Arif Kovac	(United States) Atlanta United Academy	Transfer		January 24, 2025	
40	MF	18	(United States) Santiago Pita	(United States) Atlanta United Academy	Transfer		January 24, 2025	
66	DF	25	(United States) Nykolas Sessock	(United States) Inter Miami II	Transfer	Free	February 25, 2025	
38	DF	24	(New Zealand) Ronan Wynne	(United States) University of Denver	Transfer	SuperDraft Pick	February 25, 2025	
56	MF	17	(United States) Ignacio Suarez	(United States) Atlanta United Academy	Transfer		April 15, 2025	
60	GK	17	(United States) James Donaldson	(United States) Atlanta United Academy	Transfer		September 2, 2025	

=== Out ===
No.	Pos.	Age	Player	Transferred To	Type	Notes	Date	Source
36	DF	26	(United States) Ramzi Qawasmy	(United States) Philadelphia Union II	Option Declined		January 1, 2025	
75	DF	26	(United States) Jacob Williams	Free Agent	Option Declined		January 1, 2025	
38	DF	26	(United States) Ethan Dudley	(United States) Chattanooga FC	Out of Contract		January 1, 2025	
41	MF	21	(United States) Alan Carleton	(United States) Huntsville City	Out of Contract		January 1, 2025	
45	MF	25	(Canada) Noble Okello	(United States) Phoenix Rising	Out of Contract		January 1, 2025	
55	MF	22	(Argentina) Matías Gallardo	(Argentina) Instituto	Out of Contract	Free	January 1, 2025	
88	GK	35	(United States) John Berner	(United States) FC Tulsa	Out of Contract		January 1, 2025	
96	DF	24	(United States) Daniel Russo	Free Agent	Out of Contract		January 1, 2025	
99	FW	29	(France) Karim Tmimi	Free Agent	Out of Contract		January 1, 2025	
42	GK	21	(Jamaica) Jayden Hibbert	(United States) Atlanta United	Transfer	Free	January 1, 2025	
62	MF	19	(Jamaica) Ashton Gordon	(United States) Atlanta United	Transfer	Homegrown Contract	January 1, 2025	
50	DF	18	(United States) Dominik Chong-Qui	(United States) Atlanta United	Transfer	Homegrown Contract	April 4, 2025	
48	MF	18	(United States) Cooper Sanchez	(United States) Atlanta United	Transfer	Homegrown Contract	August 5, 2025	
66	DF	25	(United States) Nyk Sessock	(United States) Atlanta United	Transfer	Free	August 5, 2025	

==== Loan out ====
No.	Pos.	Player	Loaned to	Start	End	Source
95	DF	(United States) Kaiden Moore	(United States) Philadelphia Union II	August 18, 2025	End of season	

=== Academy Departures ===
Denotes departed players from the Academy who have made at least one appearance for Atlanta United 2.

No.	Pos.	Age	Player	College/Club
64	DF	19	(United States) Miles Hadley	Army
77	MF	20	(United States) Pavel Romero	Georgia State
—	GK	20	(United States) Nash Skoglund	South Carolina

== Competitions ==
=== Standings ===
==== Eastern Conference ====
Pos	Div	Team	Pld	W	SOW	SOL	L	GF	GA	GD	Pts	Qualification
8	SE	Carolina Core FC	28	8	5	5	10	42	44	−2	39	Qualification for the Playoffs
9	NE	Toronto FC II	28	10	2	4	12	34	42	−8	38	
10	SE	Atlanta United 2	28	9	2	7	10	44	43	+1	38	
11	SE	Orlando City B	28	9	4	2	13	38	55	−17	37	
12	NE	New York City FC II	28	9	2	4	13	53	61	−8	35	

Source: MLSNP
Rules for classification: 1) points; 2) total regulation wins; 3) total goal differential; 4) total goals scored; 5) total shootout wins; 6) away goal differential; 7) away goals scored; 8) home goals differential; 9) home goals scored; 10) fewer disciplinary points; 11) drawing of lots

==== Overall table ====
Pos	Div	Team	Pld	W	SOW	SOL	L	GF	GA	GD	Pts
18	PC	Portland Timbers 2	28	10	2	4	12	47	54	−7	38
19	NE	Toronto FC II	28	10	2	4	12	34	42	−8	38
20	SE	Atlanta United 2	28	9	2	7	10	44	43	+1	38
21	FR	Houston Dynamo 2	28	9	4	2	13	40	47	−7	37
22	SE	Orlando City B	28	9	4	2	13	38	55	−17	37

Source: MLSNP
Rules for classification: 1) points; 2) total regulation wins; 3) total goal differential; 4) total goals scored; 5) total shootout wins; 6) away goal differential; 7) away goals scored; 8) home goals differential; 9) home goals scored; 10) fewer disciplinary points; 11) drawing of lots

==== Results summary ====
Round	1	2	3	4	5	6	7	8	9	10	11	12	13	14	15	16	17	18	19	20	21	22	23	24	25	26	27	28
Stadium	H	A	H	H	A	H	A	A	H	H	A	H	H	H	H	A	A	A	A	H	A	H	H	A	A	A	H	A
Result	L	D	D	W	L	D	D	D	D	W	L	L	L	D	W	D	L	L	W	W	L	W	W	L	W	W	L	D
Position (East)	15	12	11	9	11	11	10	9	11	9	11	12	13	13	12	13	13	13	13	13	13	13	9	11	11	9	10	10

A = Away; H = Home; W = Win; D = Draw; L = Loss; P = Postponed

==== Matches ====
March 7 1	Atlanta United 2	0–1	New York Red Bulls II	Kennesaw, Georgia
7:30 PM EDT		Report	Rojas 51'	Stadium: Fifth Third Bank Stadium; Referee: Elvis Osmanovic

March 16 2	Orlando City B	2–2 (4–1 p)	Atlanta United 2	Kissimmee, Florida
7:00 PM EDT	Ellis 44'; Mohammed 56'	Report	Brennan 30'; Wynne 78'	Stadium: Osceola County Stadium; Referee: Alejo Calume
	Penalties
	Guske (penalty scored); Solís (penalty scored); Platts (penalty scored); Clapier (penalty scored)		Carmichael (penalty missed); Mazzaferro (penalty missed); Neri (penalty scored)

March 30 3	Atlanta United 2	2–2 (3–4 p)	Chattanooga FC	Kennesaw, Georgia
7:30 PM EDT	Neri 78', 90+4'	Report	Morales 64' (o.g.); Ancelin 86'	Stadium: Fifth Third Bank Stadium; Attendance: 297
	Penalties
	Armas (penalty scored); Togashi (penalty missed); Neri (penalty scored); Cobb (penalty scored); Brennan (penalty missed)		(penalty scored) Naglestad; (penalty scored) Sar-Sar; (penalty scored) Screen; (penalty missed) Mendonça; (penalty scored) Mangarov

April 6 4	Atlanta United 2	3–2	Inter Miami II	Kennesaw, Georgia
12:00 PM EDT	Tablante 6', 54'; Brennan 39'	Report	Saja 3'; Plambeck 89'	Stadium: Fifth Third Bank Stadium; Referee: Benjamin Meyer
Note: Game was suspended in the 24th minute due to inclement weather and then resumed on April 7 at Mercedes-Benz Stadium.

April 10 5	Philadelphia Union II	5–1	Atlanta United 2	Chester, Pennsylvania
7:00 PM EDT	Kornzeniowski 21'; Pierre 45+1'; Olney 70'; Pariano 75' (pen.); LeBlanc 76'	Report	Armas 86' (pen.)	Stadium: Subaru Park; Referee: Luis Diego Arroyo

April 23 6	Atlanta United 2	2–2 (5–4 p)	Carolina Core	Kennesaw, Georgia
7:30 PM EDT	Tablante 21'; Wesseh 48'	Report	Hadeed 29'; Leonardi 81'	Stadium: Fifth Third Bank Stadium; Referee: Jeremy Scheer
	Penalties
	Armas (penalty scored); Tablante (penalty scored); Mazzaferro (penalty scored); Torres (penalty missed); Moore (penalty scored); Weah (penalty scored)		Evans (penalty scored); Sutton (penalty scored); Covi (penalty missed); Polanco (penalty scored); Canete (penalty scored); Leonardi (penalty missed)

April 27 7	FC Cincinnati 2	0–0 (5–3 p)	Atlanta United 2	Highland Heights, Kentucky
2:00 PM EDT		Report		Stadium: NKU Soccer Stadium; Referee: Thomas Snyder
	Penalties
	Chirilă (penalty scored); Mangione (penalty scored); Schaefer (penalty scored); Manyana (penalty scored); Augee (penalty scored)		Armas (penalty scored); Mazzaferro (penalty scored); Carmichael (penalty missed); Pita (penalty scored)

May 3 8	Huntsville City	2–2 (4–5 p)	Atlanta United 2	Huntsville, Alabama
8:00 PM EDT	Knight 20'; Carleton 42'	Report	Wesseh 45'; Mazzaferro 61'	Stadium: Joe W. Davis Stadium; Referee: Kaitlyn Trowbridge
	Penalties
	Koffi (penalty missed); Gill (penalty scored); O'Brien (penalty scored); Barrett (penalty scored); Bowen (penalty scored)		Armas (penalty scored); Mazzaferro (penalty scored); Neri (penalty scored); Tablante (penalty scored); Sessock (penalty scored)

May 19 9	Atlanta United 2	2–2 (3–5 p)	Crown Legacy	Matthews, North Carolina
7:30 PM EDT	Togashi 10'; Armas 90'	Report	John 35'; Subotić 66'	Stadium: Sportsplex at Matthews; Referee: John Rush
	Penalties
	Armas (penalty scored); Wesseh (penalty missed); Mazzaferro (penalty scored); Neri (penalty scored)		John (penalty scored); Romero (penalty scored); Smith (penalty scored); Mendoza (penalty scored); Sing (penalty scored)
Note: Match rescheduled to be played in Matthews, NC due to stadium availability.

May 25 10	Atlanta United 2	3–0	Orlando City B	Kissimmee, Florida
7:00 PM EDT	Wesseh 4'; Togashi 45', 68'	Report		Stadium: Osceola County Stadium; Referee: Servando Berna
Note: Match rescheduled to be played in Kissimmee, FL due to stadium availability.

May 30 11	New York Red Bulls II	1–0	Atlanta United 2	Montclair, New Jersey
5:00 PM EDT	Benedetti 80'	Report		Stadium: MSU Soccer Park; Referee: Jeremy Scheer

June 6 12	Atlanta United 2	2–3	New York City II	Athens, Georgia
1:00 PM EDT	Neri 2', 73'	Report	Cavallo 29'; Reid 55' (pen.), 65'	Stadium: Turner Soccer Complex; Referee: Aleksandar Zhelyazkov
Note: Match rescheduled to be played in Athens GA due to stadium availability.

June 11 13	Atlanta United 2	0–1	Huntsville City	Athens, Georgia
5:00 PM EDT		Report	Koffi 45+1' (pen.)	Stadium: Turner Soccer Complex; Referee: Kyle Johnston
Note: Match rescheduled to be played in Athens GA due to stadium availability.

July 9 14	Atlanta United 2	0–0 (3–4 p)	FC Cincinnati 2	Kennesaw, Georgia
7:00 PM EDT		Report		Stadium: Fifth Third Bank Stadium; Referee: Shawn Tehini
	Penalties
	Armas (penalty missed); Mazzaferro (penalty scored); Neri (penalty scored); Chong-Qui (penalty scored); Moore (penalty missed)		Ikoba (penalty scored); Mangione (penalty scored); Chávez (penalty scored); Adnan (penalty missed); Daley (penalty scored)

July 13 15	Atlanta United 2	3–2	Columbus Crew 2	Kennesaw, Georgia
7:00 PM EDT	Neri 57'; Weah 77' (pen.), 88'	Report	Elliot 62'; Adu-Gyamfi 57'	Stadium: Fifth Third Bank Stadium; Referee: Josiah Parke

July 19 16	Carolina Core	1–1 (5–4 p)	Atlanta United 2	High Point, North Carolina
6:00 PM EDT	Canete 4'	Report	Armas 90'	Stadium: Truist Point; Referee: Gary Gutierrez
	Penalties
	Sutton (penalty missed); Bazaes (penalty scored); Thomas (penalty scored); J.P. Rodriguez (penalty scored); Covi (penalty scored); Rodriguez (penalty missed); Chica (penalty scored)		Armas (penalty missed); Mazzaferro (penalty scored); Tablante (penalty scored); Chong-Qui (penalty scored); Neri (penalty scored); Wynne (penalty missed); Torres (penalty missed)

July 30 17	New England Revolution II	3–0	Atlanta United 2	Foxborough, Massachusetts
11:00 AM EDT	Dias 4' (pen.); Fry 11'; Butts 25'	Report		Stadium: Gillette Stadium; Referee: Andrew Porada

August 3 18	Inter Miami II	2–1	Atlanta United 2	Fort Lauderdale, Florida
7:00 PM EDT	Pintér 44'; Delinois 88'	Report	Tablante 18'	Stadium: Chase Stadium; Referee: Habeeb Hooshmand

August 8 19	Toronto FC II	1–3	Atlanta United 2	Toronto, Ontario
7:00 PM EDT	Cimermancic 69'	Report	Weah 7'; Carmichael 20'; Neri 61'	Stadium: York Lions Stadium

August 17 20	Atlanta United 2	1–0	Crown Legacy	Kennesaw, Georgia
7:30 PM EDT	Weah 78'	Report		Stadium: Fifth Third Bank Stadium; Referee: Patricia McCracken

August 23 21	Orlando City B	2–1	Atlanta United 2	Kissimmee, Florida
7:00 PM EDT	Thalles 53'; Mohammed 90+5'	Report	Weah 48'	Stadium: Osceola County Stadium; Referee: Stephen Foster

August 27 22	Atlanta United 2	4–1	Inter Miami II	Kennesaw, Georgia
7:30 PM EDT	Afonso 8'; Mazzaferro 49'; Tablante 52'; Suarez 83'	Report	Rey 82'	Stadium: Fifth Third Bank Stadium; Referee: Alex Beehler

August 30 23	Atlanta United 2	2–0	Huntsville City	Kennesaw, Georgia
7:30 PM EDT	Sanchez 7'; Majub 43'	Report		Stadium: Fifth Third Bank Stadium; Referee: Jordan Gray

September 13 24	Carolina Core	4–2	Atlanta United 2	High Point, North Carolina
7:30 PM EDT	Ibarra 37'; Canete 45+1', 67' (pen.); Thomas 62'	Report	Weah 15'; Pita 52'	Stadium: Truist Point; Referee: Muhammad Kaleia

September 20 25	Crown Legacy	0–1	Atlanta United 2	Matthews, North Carolina
7:00 PM EDT		Report	Weah 12'	Stadium: Sportsplex at Matthews; Referee: Robert Vincze

September 24 26	Atlanta United 2	0–1	Chattanooga FC	Kennesaw, Georgia
7:30 PM EDT		Report	Mangarov 11'	Stadium: Fifth Third Bank Stadium; Referee: Abdou Ndiaye
Note: Game was suspended in the 71st minute due to inclement weather and was resumed on October 2nd.

September 28 27	Chicago Fire II	2–5	Atlanta United 2	Bridgeview, Illinois
2:00 PM EDT	Shokalook 45' (pen.); Turdean 90'	Report	Weah 13' (pen.), 43'; Wesseh 33'; Mazzaferro 62'; Kovač 85'	Stadium: SeatGeek Stadium; Referee: Calin Radosav

October 5 28	Chattanooga FC	1–1 (5–4 p)	Atlanta United 2	Chattanooga, Tennessee
1:00 PM EDT	Cohen 26'	Report	Pita 2'	Stadium: Finley Stadium; Referee: Izlen Peksenar
	Penalties
	Robertson (penalty missed); Mangarov (penalty scored); Rimple (penalty scored); Watson (penalty scored); Sar-Sar (penalty scored); Turner (penalty scored)		Weah (penalty scored); Armas (penalty scored); Kovač (penalty scored); Mazzaferro (penalty missed); Tablante (penalty scored); Wesseh (penalty missed)

== Statistics ==
=== Top Scorers ===
As of October 5, 2025

Place	Position	Name	MLS Next Pro	Playoffs	Total
1	FW	(Liberia) Patrick Weah	9	—	9
2	FW	(United States) Rodrigo Neri	6	—	6
3	MF	(Venezuela) Moises Tablante	5	—	5
4	MF	(United States) Gabriel Wesseh	4	—	4
5	MF	(Spain) Javier Armas	3	—	3
5	MF	(Canada) Salvatore Mazzaferro	3	—	3
5	FW	(Japan) Cayman Togashi	3	—	3
8	MF	(United States) Luke Brennan	2	—	2
8	MF	(United States) Santiago Pita	2	—	2
10	MF	(Brazil) Leo Afonso	1	—	1
10	MF	(Northern Ireland) Ryan Carmichael	1	—	1
10	MF	(United States) Arif Kovač	1	—	1
10	DF	(Uganda) Toto Majub	1	—	1
10	MF	(United States) Cooper Sanchez	1	—	1
10	MF	(United States) Ignacio Suarez	1	—	1
10	DF	(New Zealand) Ronan Wynne	1	—	1
Total			44	—	44
