= Adrian Gill =

Adrian Gill may refer to:

- Adrian Gill (meteorologist) (1937–1986), Australian meteorologist and oceanographer
- A. A. Gill (1954–2016), Adrian Anthony Gill, British journalist, critic, and author
- Adrian Gill (soccer) (born 2006), American soccer player
