= List of Atlanta United FC seasons =

Since its inaugural 2017 season, the American soccer club Atlanta United FC has competed in Major League Soccer. The following information summarizes the club's performance in all competitive competitions.

== Key ==
Key to competitions

- Major League Soccer (MLS) – The top-flight of soccer in the United States, established in 1996.
- U.S. Open Cup (USOC) – The premier knockout cup competition in U.S. soccer, first contested in 1914.
- CONCACAF Champions Cup (CCC) – The premier competition in North American soccer since 1962. It went by the name of Champions' Cup until 2008 and CONCACAF Champions League (CCL) from 2008 to 2023.

Key to colors and symbols

1st or W	Winners
2nd or RU	Runners-up
3rd	Third place
Last	Wooden Spoon
♦	MLS Golden Boot
	Highest average attendance
Italics	Ongoing competition

Key to league record

- Season = The year and article of the season
- Div = Division/level on pyramid
- League = League name
- Pld = Games played
- W = Games won
- L = Games lost
- D = Games drawn
- GF = Goals for
- GA = Goals against
- GD = Goal difference
- Pts = Points
- PPG = Points per game
- Conf. = Conference position
- Overall = League position

Key to cup record

- DNE = Did not enter
- DNQ = Did not qualify
- NH = Competition not held or canceled
- QR = Qualifying round
- PR = Preliminary round
- GS = Group stage
- R1 = First round
- R2 = Second round
- R3 = Third round
- R4 = Fourth round
- R5 = Fifth round
- Ro16 = Round of 16
- QF = Quarterfinals
- SF = Semifinals
- F = Final
- RU = Runners-up
- W = Winners

== Seasons ==
Season	League									Position		Playoffs	USOC	Continental		Other		Average attendance (Note: Average attendance includes statistics from league matches only.)	Top goalscorer(s) (Note: Top goalscorer(s) includes all goals scored in the regular season, MLS Cup Playoffs, U.S. Open Cup, MLS is Back Tournament, CONCACAF Champions League, FIFA Club World Cup, and other competitive continental matches.)	
Season	Pld	W	L	D	GF	GA	GD	Pts	PPG	Conf.	Overall	Playoffs	USOC	CCC	LC	Other		Average attendance	Name(s)	Goals
2017	34	15	9	10	70	40	+30	55	1.62	4th	4th	R1	Ro16	DNQ	—	—	—	48,200	(Venezuela) Josef Martínez	20
2018	34	21	7	6	70	44	+26	69	2.03	2nd	2nd	W	Ro16	DNQ	—	—	—	53,002	(Venezuela) Josef Martínez	35♦ (Note: Martínez won the MLS Golden Boot (31 goals).)
2019	34	18	12	4	58	43	+15	58	1.71	2nd	3rd	SF	W	QF	DNQ	Campeones Cup	W	52,510	(Venezuela) Josef Martínez	33
2020	23	6	13	4	23	30	−7	22	0.96	12th	23rd	DNQ	NH	QF	NH	MLS is Back	GS	27,193 (Note: Capacity limited due to the COVID-19 pandemic)	(Republic of Ireland) Jon Gallagher (Argentina) Pity Martínez	4
2021	34	13	9	12	45	37	+8	51	1.50	5th	9th	R1	NH	QF	DNQ	—	—	43,964	(Venezuela) Josef Martínez	12
2022	34	10	14	10	48	54	−6	40	1.18	11th	23rd	DNQ	R4	DNQ	NH	—	—	47,116	(Venezuela) Josef Martínez	9
2023	34	13	9	12	66	53	+13	51	1.50	6th	10th	R1	GS	DNQ	GS	—	—	47,526	(Greece) Giorgos Giakoumakis	17
2024	34	10	14	10	46	49	−3	40	1.18	9th	20th	QF	QF	DNQ	GS	—	—	46,831	(Georgia (country)) Saba Lobzhanidze	11
Total	261	106	87	68	426	350	+76	386	1.48	—	—	—	—	—	—	—	—	—	(Venezuela) Josef Martínez	111
