= Gabriel Wesseh =

American soccer player (born 2008)

Personal information
- Full name: Gabriel Juty Wesseh
- Date of birth: May 6, 2008 (age 18)
- Height: 1.79 m (5 ft 10 in)
- Position: Winger

Team information
- Current team: Fredrikstad
- Number: 29

Youth career
- –2024: Philadelphia Union
- 2025: Atlanta United

Senior career*
Years	Team	Apps	(Gls)
2025	Atlanta United 2	23	(4)
2026–	Fredrikstad	12	(3)

International career^{‡}
2026–	United States U19	1	(0)
- * Club domestic league appearances and goals as of 19 September 2026 ‡ National team caps and goals as of 2 October 2026

Gabriel Juty Wesseh (born 6 May 2008) is an American professional soccer player who plays as a winger for Fredrikstad.

== Club career ==
As a youth player, Wesseh joined the youth academy of Philadelphia Union. Following his stint here, he joined the youth academy of Atlanta United ahead of the 2025 season and was promoted to the club's reserve team the same year, where he scored three goals in 23 league appearances.

In 2026, Wesseh signed for Norwegian side Fredrikstad. On 8 August 2026, he scored his first goal for the club in a 1–0 away win over Start in the league.

== International career ==
Wesseh is a United States youth international and has represented the country at under-19 level. He is also eligible to represent Liberia through his parents.

On 2 October 2026, he debuted for the United States men's national under-19 soccer team during a 1–2 away friendly loss to England.

== Style of play ==
Wesseh plays as a winger and is left-footed and is known for his speed and technical ability.

Norwegian newspaper Fredriksstad Blad wrote in 2026 that he "is described as an unpredictable attacker who is good with both feet and has extreme drive with the ball. Those who have followed him on the training field describe a goal-scoring player who does things few others dare to try".
