= Lucas Hoyos =

Argentine footballer (born 1989)

Personal information
- Full name: Lucas Adrián Hoyos
- Date of birth: 29 April 1989 (age 37)
- Place of birth: Guaymallén, Argentina
- Height: 1.83 m (6 ft 0 in)
- Position: Goalkeeper

Team information
- Current team: Atlanta United
- Number: 1

Youth career
- Newell's Old Boys

Senior career*
Years	Team	Apps	(Gls)
2010–2015	Newell's Old Boys	1	(0)
2011–2012	→ San Martín (loan)	32	(0)
2012–2014	→ Gimnasia y Esgrima (loan)	70	(0)
2015–2016	Instituto	61	(0)
2016–2017	Atlético de Rafaela	25	(0)
2017–2018	Instituto	24	(0)
2018–2022	Vélez Sarsfield	72	(0)
2023–2025	Newell's Old Boys	38	(0)
2026–	Atlanta United	33	(0)

International career
2008–2009	Argentina U20	6	(0)
- * Club domestic league appearances and goals as of 13:15, 15 November 2026 (UTC)

Lucas Adrián Hoyos (born 29 April 1989) is an Argentine professional footballer who plays for Atlanta United .

== Career ==
=== Club ===
Hoyos' career began with Newell's Old Boys, firstly in the youth ranks before making the move into senior football. He made his Newell's Old Boys debut on 20 November 2014 in an Argentine Primera División defeat to Defensa y Justicia. Before that, Hoyos spent time out on loan at two clubs. First, he joined San Martín of Torneo Argentino A before completing a move to Primera B Nacional side Gimnasia y Esgrima. He made seventy-one appearances across two seasons for Gimnasia prior to returning to Newell's to make his debut for them. 2015 saw Hoyos join another Primera B Nacional team, Instituto, permanently.

Sixty-three league matches later he departed to join Argentine Primera División club Atlético de Rafaela in 2016. Rafaela were relegated at the end of 2016–17 season, Hoyos subsequently left to rejoin Instituto. His second debut for the club came on 21 August 2017 in the Copa Argentina against River Plate. He made his 200th league appearance in the following November versus previous club Atlético de Rafaela. July 2018 saw Hoyos complete a move to Vélez Sarsfield of the Primera División.

On 23 December 2025, Hoyos signed with Major League Soccer club Atlanta United as a free agent.

=== International ===
Hoyos won six caps for Sergio Batista's Argentina U20s team during 2008 and 2009.

== Career statistics ==
As of 9 September 2018.

Club statistics
Club	Season	League			Cup (Note: Includes the Copa Argentina)		League Cup		Continental (Note: Includes the Copa Libertadores and Copa Sudamericana)		Other		Total	
Club	Season	Division	Apps	Goals	Apps	Goals	Apps	Goals	Apps	Goals	Apps	Goals	Apps	Goals
Newell's Old Boys	2009–10	Primera División	0	0	0	0	—		0	0	0	0	0	0
Newell's Old Boys	2010–11	Primera División	0	0	0	0	—		0	0	0	0	0	0
Newell's Old Boys	2011–12	Primera División	0	0	0	0	—		—		0	0	0	0
Newell's Old Boys	2012–13	Primera División	0	0	0	0	—		0	0	0	0	0	0
Newell's Old Boys	2013–14	Primera División	0	0	0	0	—		0	0	0	0	0	0
Newell's Old Boys	2014	Primera División	1	0	1	0	—		0	0	0	0	2	0
Newell's Old Boys	Total		1	0	1	0	—		0	0	0	0	2	0
San Martín (loan)	2011–12	Torneo Argentino A	32	0	0	0	—		—		0	0	32	0
Gimnasia y Esgrima (loan)	2012–13	Primera B Nacional	30	0	1	0	—		—		0	0	31	0
Gimnasia y Esgrima (loan)	2013–14	Primera B Nacional	40	0	0	0	—		—		0	0	40	0
Gimnasia y Esgrima (loan)	Total		70	0	1	0	—		—		0	0	71	0
Instituto	2015	Primera B Nacional	41	0	2	0	—		—		2 (Note: Two appearances in 2015 Primera B Nacional play-offs)	0	45	0
Instituto	2016	Primera B Nacional	20	0	1	0	—		—		0	0	21	0
Instituto	Total		61	0	3	0	—		—		2	0	66	0
Atlético de Rafaela	2016–17	Primera División	25	0	1	0	—		—		0	0	26	0
Instituto	2017–18	Primera B Nacional	24	0	1	0	—		—		1 (Note: One appearance in 2017–18 Primera B Nacional play-offs)	0	26	0
Vélez Sarsfield	2018–19	Primera División	0	0	1	0	—		—		0	0	1	0
Career total			213	0	8	0	—		0	0	3	0	224	0
