= Tomás Jacob =

Argentine footballer (born 2004)

Personal information
- Full name: Tomás Jacob
- Date of birth: 20 April 2004 (age 22)
- Place of birth: Santa Fe, Argentina
- Height: 1.88 m (6 ft 2 in)
- Position: Defensive midfielder

Team information
- Current team: Atlanta United
- Number: 55

Youth career
- Newell's

Senior career*
Years	Team	Apps	(Gls)
2021–2025	Newell's	50	(0)
2025	Necaxa	17	(1)
2026–	Atlanta United	30	(4)
- * Club domestic league appearances and goals as of 13:28, 15 November 2026 (UTC)

Tomás Jacob is an Argentine professional footballer who plays as a defensive midfielder and right back for Atlanta United.

== Career ==
Born in Santa Fe, Argentina, Jacob came through the Newell's Old Boys academy system before making his first-team debut against Independiente on October 31, 2021. During the 2022 campaign, he featured in 14 league matches and notched his first career assist in a match against Godoy Cruz on August 27. Moving between the first and reserve squads, Jacob accumulated 13 top-flight appearances in 2024 and another 13 in 2025, showcasing his versatility across right back, center back, and central midfield positions.

On July 15, 2025, Jacob completed his transfer to Mexican club Necaxa, making his debut just three days later in a league fixture against Querétaro. He established himself as a regular during the 2025 Apertura season, starting 12 of his 14 appearances.

In December 2025, Jacob signed with MLS side Atlanta United.

== Club career ==
As of May 29, 2026

Appearances and goals by club, season and competition
Club	Season	League			Cup		Continental		Other		Total	
Club	Season	Division	Apps	Goals	Apps	Goals	Apps	Goals	Apps	Goals	Apps	Goals
Newell's	2021	Primera División	4	0	0	0	0	0	—		4	0
Newell's	2022	Primera División	15	0	2	0	0	0	—		17	0
Newell's	2023	Primera División	0	0	0	0	0	0	—		0	0
Newell's	2024	Primera División	13	0	2	0	0	0	—		15	0
Newell's	2025	Primera División	13	0	1	0	0	0	—		14	0
Newell's	Total		45	0	5	0	0	0	0	0	50	0
Necaxa	2025–26	Liga MX	14	1	—		—		3 (Note: Appearance(s) in Leagues Cup)	0	17	1
Atlanta United	2026	MLS	12	1	1	0	0	0	0	0	13	1
Career total			59	1	5	0	0	0	3	0	67	1
