= Elías Báez =

Argentine footballer (born 2004)

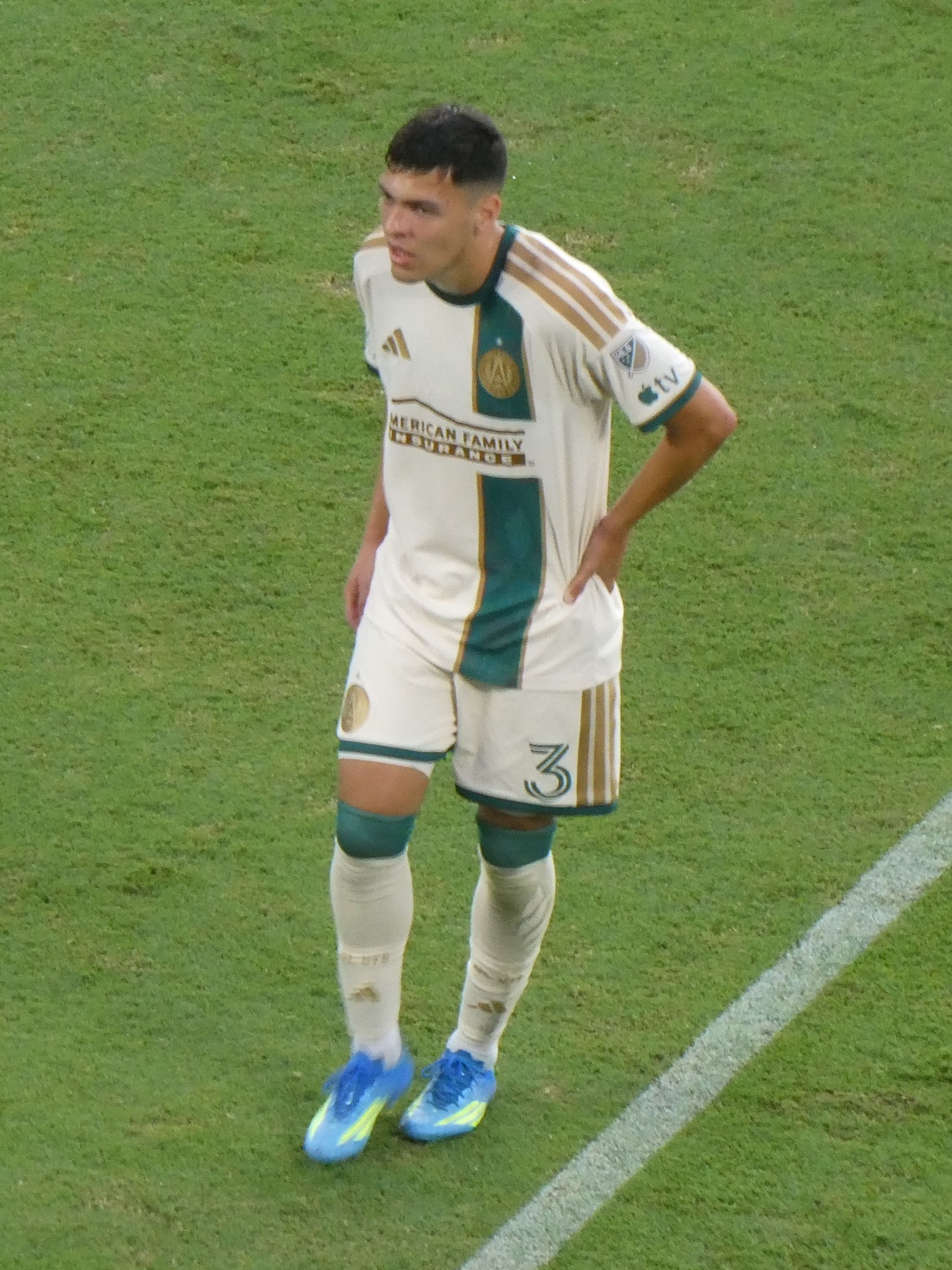
- Báez in 2026

Personal information
- Full name: Elías de Jesús Báez Sotelo
- Date of birth: October 18, 2004 (age 22)
- Place of birth: Rafael Castillo, Argentina
- Height: 1.75 m (5 ft 9 in)
- Position: Left-back

Team information
- Current team: Atlanta United FC
- Number: 3

Youth career
- San Lorenzo

Senior career*
Years	Team	Apps	(Gls)
2024–2026	San Lorenzo	52	(1)
2026–	Atlanta United FC	31	(1)
- * Club domestic league appearances and goals as of 13:17, 15 November 2026 (UTC)

Elías de Jesús Báez Sotelo (born 18 October 2004) is an Argentine footballer who plays as a left-back for Major League Soccer club Atlanta United FC.

== Club career ==
Báez is a product of the Argentine club San Lorenzo, and was promoted to their reserves in 2021. On 14 July 2023, he signed his first professional contract with the club and was promoted to their senior team. He made his senior and professional debut with San Lorenzo in a 10 Copa de la Liga Profesional win over Defensa y Justicia on 6 April 2024. He transferred to Major League Soccer club Atlanta United FC on a contract until 2028, with options for 2029 and 2030.
