= Matthew Edwards (soccer) =

American soccer player (born 2003)

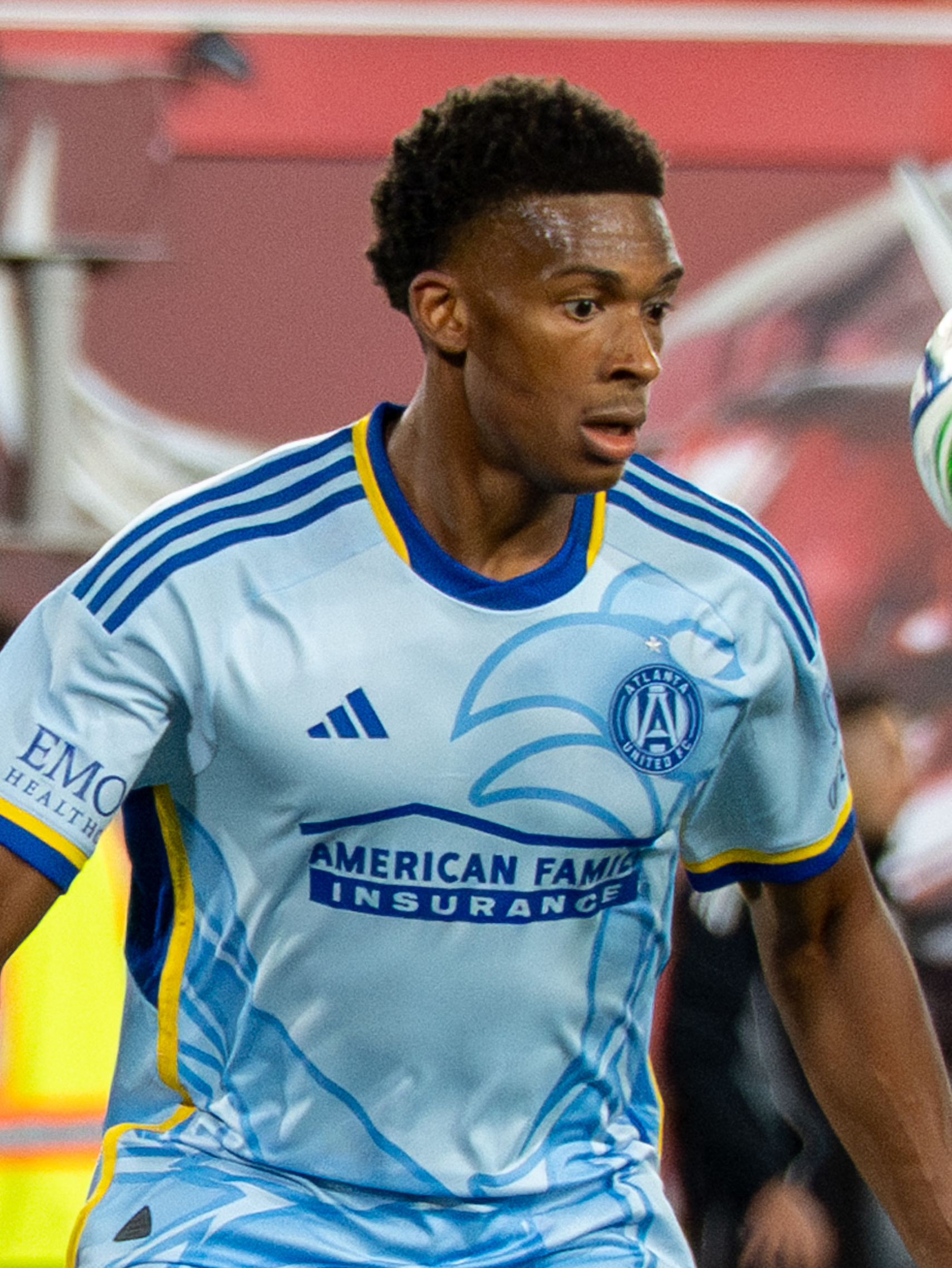
- Edwards with Atlanta United in 2025

Personal information
- Date of birth: February 17, 2003 (age 23)
- Place of birth: Apex, North Carolina, United States
- Height: 5 ft 10 in (1.78 m)
- Position: Midfielder

Team information
- Current team: Atlanta United
- Number: 47

Youth career
- 2019–2020: Atlanta United

College career
Years	Team	Apps	(Gls)
2021–2023	North Carolina Tar Heels	41	(0)

Senior career*
Years	Team	Apps	(Gls)
2020	Atlanta United 2	8	(0)
2024–	Atlanta United 2	17	(0)
2024–	Atlanta United	44	(0)
- * Club domestic league appearances and goals as of 13:26, 15 November 2026 (UTC)

Matthew Edwards (born February 17, 2003) is an American soccer player who plays for Atlanta United in Major League Soccer.

== Club career ==
On July 11, 2020, Edwards debuted for Atlanta United 2 against the Tampa Bay Rowdies.
