= Cooper Sanchez =

American soccer player (born 2008)

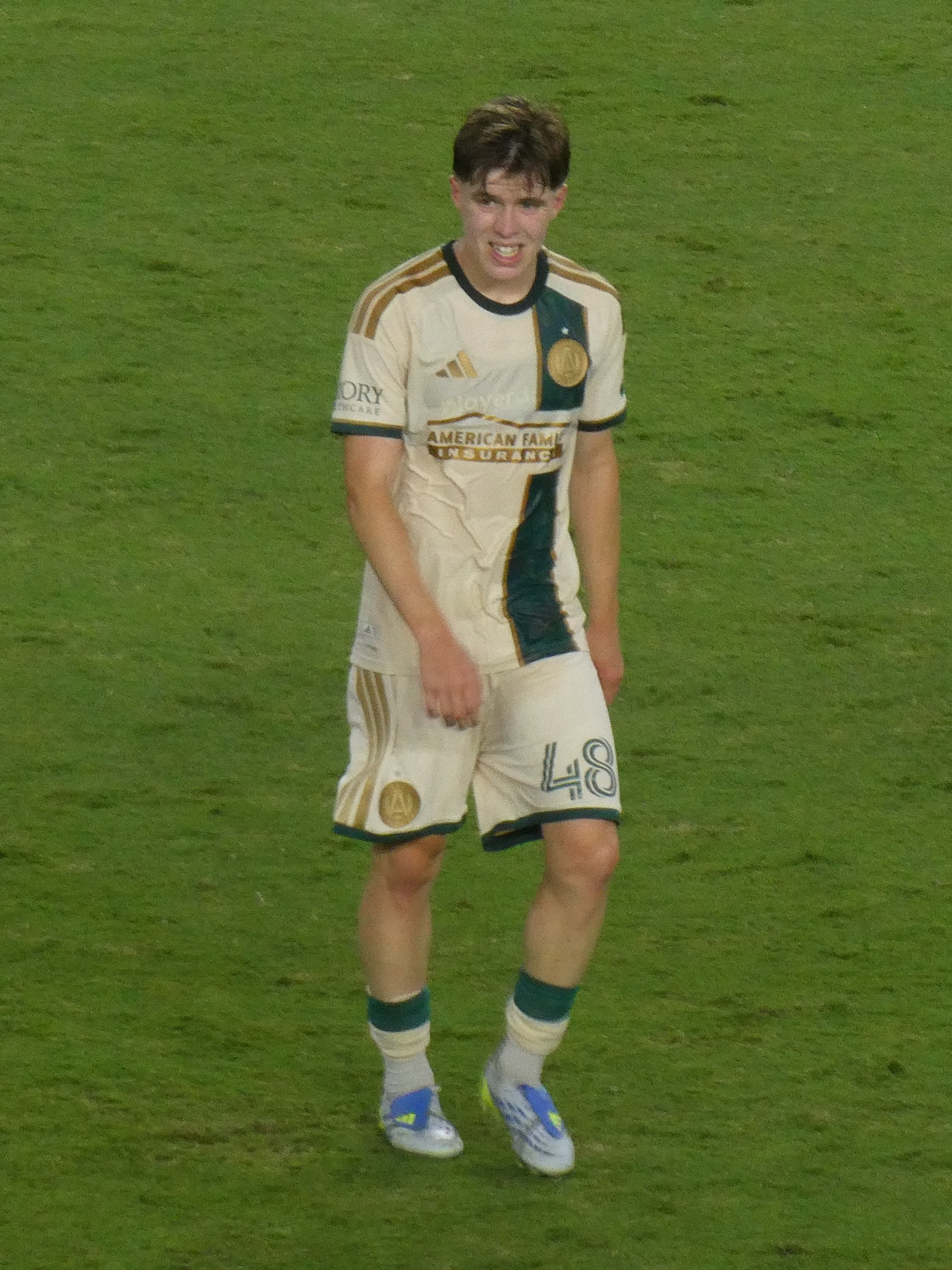
- Sanchez in 2026

Personal information
- Full name: Cooper Wyatt Sanchez
- Date of birth: March 26, 2008 (age 18)
- Place of birth: Seattle, United States
- Height: 5 ft 9 in (1.75 m)
- Position: Midfielder

Team information
- Current team: Atlanta United FC
- Number: 48

Youth career
- Columbus Crew
- 2017–2018: FC Utrecht
- 2018–2023: Atlanta United FC

Senior career*
Years	Team	Apps	(Gls)
2023–2025	Atlanta United 2	28	(1)
2025–	Atlanta United	31	(1)

International career^{‡}
2024	United States U16	1	(0)
2025	United States U17	3	(0)
2026–	United States U18	2	(0)
2026–	United States U20	4	(0)
- * Club domestic league appearances and goals as of 13:27, 15 November 2026 (UTC) ‡ National team caps and goals as of 20:59, July 27, 2026 (UTC)

Cooper Wyatt Sanchez (Spanish: Sánchez; born March 26, 2008) is an American professional soccer player who plays as a central midfielder for Atlanta United FC in Major League Soccer.

== Club career ==
Sanchez began his youth career at Columbus Crew, with a stint at the Dutch club FC Utrecht, before returning to the United States with Atlanta United FC at the age of 12. In 2023, Sanchez became the youngest player in club history to appear for Atlanta United 2, the club's reserve team in the MLS Next Pro. On July 2, 2024, he signed his first professional contract with Atlanta United 2. On August 5, 2025, he signed a contract with the senior Atlanta United side as a Homegrown Player running through 2026, with options for 2027 and 2028. He made his senior debut with Atlanta United in a 4–1 Leagues Cup win over Atlas F.C. on August 6, 2025.

== International career ==
Born in the United States, Sanchez is of Mexican-American descent. He was called up to the United States U17s for the 2025 FIFA U-17 World Cup. He was named to the United States U20s for the 2026 CONCACAF U-20 Championship.
