= Will Reilly =

American soccer player (born 2002)

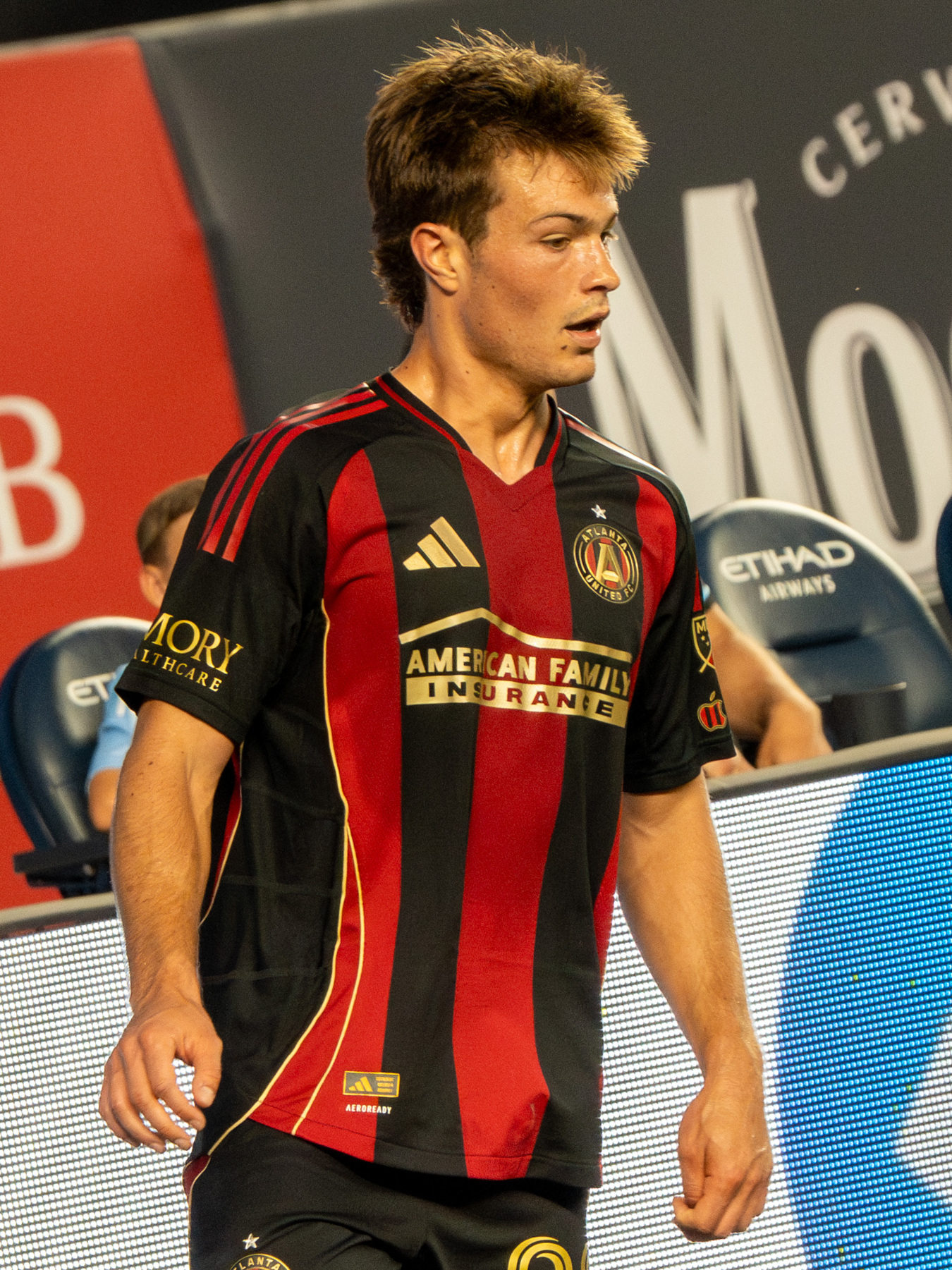
- Reilly with Atlanta United in 2025

Personal information
- Full name: William James Reilly
- Date of birth: December 3, 2002 (age 23)
- Place of birth: Decatur, Georgia, US
- Height: 1.78 m (5 ft 10 in)
- Position: Midfielder

Team information
- Current team: Atlanta United
- Number: 28

Youth career
- 2015–2016: Georgia United
- 2016–2021: Atlanta United

College career
Years	Team	Apps	(Gls)
2021–2024	Stanford Cardinal	75	(11)

Senior career*
Years	Team	Apps	(Gls)
2019–	Atlanta United 2	42	(0)
2025–	Atlanta United	22	(1)

International career
2018	United States U17	2	(0)
- * Club domestic league appearances and goals as of 13:24, 15 November 2026 (UTC)

William James Reilly (born December 3, 2002) is an American professional soccer player who plays as a midfielder for Atlanta United in Major League Soccer.

== Career ==
In 2018, Reilly played for the United States U-17 men's national soccer team, starting in friendly matches against England, Russia and Portugal.

On July 13, 2019, Reilly appeared for Atlanta United 2, the USL Championship affiliate of Atlanta United FC, appearing as a half-time substitute in an 8–1 loss to New York Red Bulls II.

Reilly enrolled at Stanford University and joined their men's soccer team in 2021. He made his collegiate debut on August 26 against the SMU Mustangs.

On December 20, 2024, Reilly signed a homegrown player deal with Atlanta United FC. Reilly scored his first professional goal on July 16, 2025, against the Chicago Fire.
