= Cayman Togashi =

Japanese footballer (born 1993)

Cayman Togashi 富樫 敬真
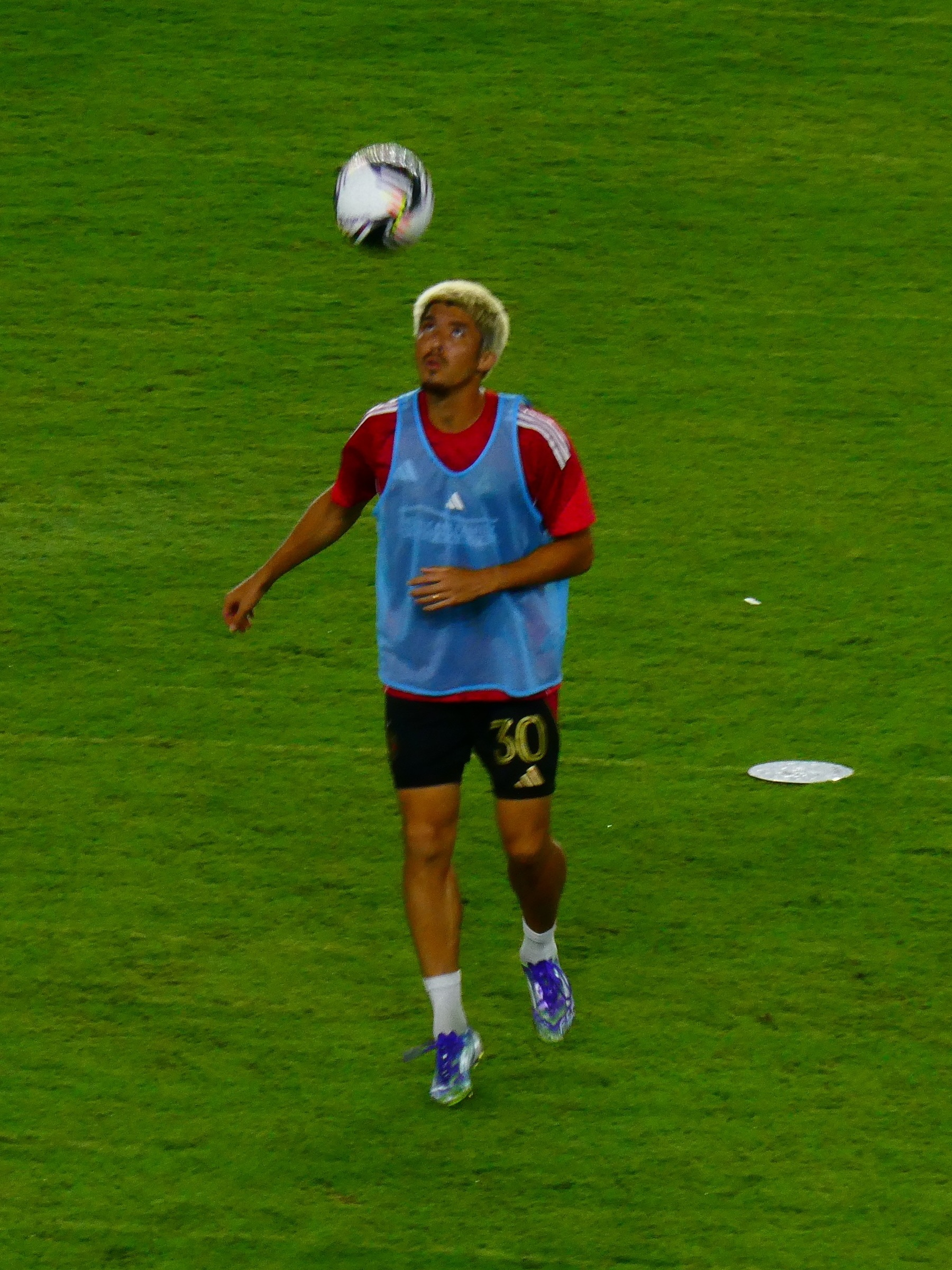

Personal information
- Full name: Cayman Graybill Togashi
- Date of birth: 10 August 1993 (age 33)
- Place of birth: New York City, United States
- Height: 1.78 m (5 ft 10 in)
- Position: Forward

Team information
- Current team: Atlanta United
- Number: 30

Youth career
- 2006–2008: Yokohama F. Marinos
- 2009–2011: Nihon University High School

College career
Years	Team	Apps	(Gls)
2012–2015	Kanto Gakuin University		

Senior career*
Years	Team	Apps	(Gls)
2015–2018	Yokohama F. Marinos	38	(8)
2018	→ FC Tokyo (loan)	19	(1)
2018	→ FC Tokyo U-23 (loan)	9	(2)
2019	Machida Zelvia	30	(5)
2020–2021	V-Varen Nagasaki	49	(8)
2021–2022	Vegalta Sendai	49	(14)
2023–2024	Sagan Tosu	59	(7)
2025–	Atlanta United	14	(0)
2025–	Atlanta United 2	9	(4)

International career
2016	Japan U23		
Medal record
Yokohama F. Marinos
Runner-up	Emperor's Cup	2017
- * Club domestic league appearances and goals as of 16:40, 12 November 2026 (UTC)

Cayman Graybill Togashi (富樫 敬真, Togashi Keiman; born 10 August 1993) is a professional footballer who plays as a forward for Major League Soccer club Atlanta United FC. Born in the United States, he has represented Japan at youth level.

== Career ==
Togashi was born in New York City to a Japanese father and an American mother who was the daughter of Anabaptist missionaries in Japan. At the age of six, his family moved to Yokohama. From a young age, he was associated with the Yokohama F. Marinos, the biggest club in his hometown. He was first a Special Designated Player in 2015, then he signed a full professional contract for 2016.

Togashi signed for Atlanta United FC of Major League Soccer on 8 January 2025 and is intended to serve as a backup in the position.

== Career statistics ==
=== Club ===
As of As of July 26, 2026.

Club performance			League		Cup		League Cup		Total	
Club	Season	League	Apps	Goals	Apps	Goals	Apps	Goals	Apps	Goals
Yokohama F. Marinos	2015	J1 League	4	1	0	0	–		4	1
Yokohama F. Marinos	2016	J1 League	18	5	4	0	3	1	25	6
Yokohama F. Marinos	2017	J1 League	16	2	4	1	2	0	22	3
Yokohama F. Marinos	Total		38	8	8	1	5	1	51	10
FC Tokyo (loan)	2018	J1 League	19	1	3	0	6	2	28	3
FC Tokyo U-23 (loan)	2018	J3 League	9	2	–		–		9	2
Machida Zelvia	2019	J2 League	30	5	1	0	–		31	5
V-Varen Nagasaki	2020	J2 League	34	7	–		–		34	7
V-Varen Nagasaki	2021	J2 League	15	1	2	0	–		17	1
V-Varen Nagasaki	Total		49	8	2	0	0	0	51	8
Vegalta Sendai	2021	J1 League	12	3	0	0	0	0	12	3
Vegalta Sendai	2022	J2 League	37	11	2	0	–		39	11
Vegalta Sendai	Total		49	14	2	0	0	0	51	14
Sagan Tosu	2023	J1 League	22	5	1	0	0	0	23	5
Sagan Tosu	2024	J1 League	37	2	1	0	1	0	39	2
Sagan Tosu	Total		59	7	2	0	1	0	62	7
Atlanta United	2025	MLS	7	0	0	0	2	1	9	1
Atlanta United	2026	MLS	7	0	1	1	0	0	8	1
Career total			267	45	19	1	14	4	300	51

== International ==
- Japan national under-23 football team
  - 2016 Toulon Tournament
