= Adrian Gill (soccer) =

American soccer player (born 2006)

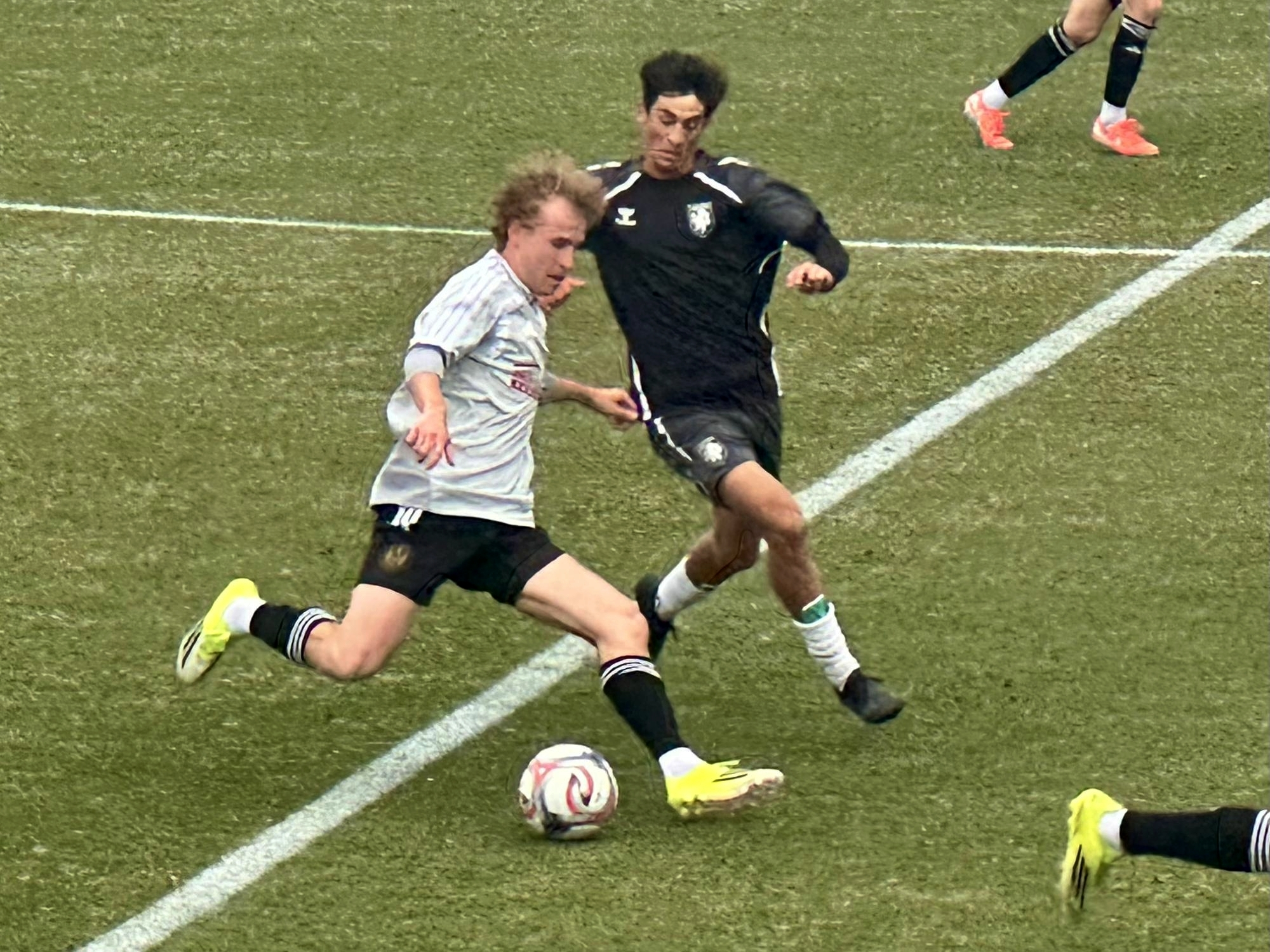
- Gill (left) playing for Atlanta United in 2026

Personal information
- Full name: Adrian Simon Gill
- Date of birth: January 3, 2006 (age 20)
- Place of birth: Denver, Colorado, United States
- Positions: Central midfielder; full-back

Team information
- Current team: Atlanta United
- Number: 16

Youth career
- 2017–2018: Cornellà
- 2018–2025: Barcelona

Senior career*
Years	Team	Apps	(Gls)
2025–2026	Barcelona B	0	(0)
2025–2026	→ Cornellà (loan)	4	(0)
2026–	Atlanta United	7	(0)
2026–	Atlanta United 2	16	(1)

International career^{‡}
2022–2023	United States U17	10	(0)
Medal record
Men's football
Representing United States
CONCACAF U-17 Championship
Runner-up	2023 Guatemala
- * Club domestic league appearances and goals as of 13:21, 15 November 2026 (UTC) ‡ National team caps and goals as of February 18, 2023

Adrian Simon Gill (born January 3, 2006) is an American professional soccer player who plays as a central midfielder for Major League Soccer club Atlanta United.

== Club career ==
Born in Denver, Colorado, Gill moved to Catalonia as a child due to his parents' work commitments. In 2017, shortly after moving to Spain, he joined Cornellà, before a move to Spanish giants Barcelona the following year.

Having progressed through Barcelona's La Masia academy, he signed his first professional contract with the club in March 2022. Gill suffered an ACL injury in September 2023, shortly after training with the first team for the first time, and went through 14 months of rehabilitation before returning to Barça's U19 team in October 2024 and making 3 appearances that fall. On August 21, 2025, Gill signed a one-year contract extension with Barcelona. The following October 31, Gill returned to his former youth club, Cornellà, joining them on a season-long loan deal.

On January 27, 2026, Major League Soccer club Atlanta United announced the signing of Gill from Barcelona, signing him on a one-year deal with options to extend until 2030. Barcelona retains a percentage of any future sale.

== International career ==
Gill has represented the United States at youth international level. He is also eligible to play for Spain but declined an invitation by the Royal Spanish Football Federation to represent them in April 2022, expressing his desire to represent the United States at senior international level.

== Honors ==
Barcelona

- UEFA Youth League: 2024–25

United States U17

- CONCACAF U17 Championship runner-up: 2023
