= Atlanta United FC =

American professional soccer club

- Full name: Atlanta United FC
- Nickname: The Five Stripes
- Short name: ATL UTD
- Founded: April 16, 2014; 12 years ago
- Stadium: Mercedes-Benz Stadium; Atlanta, Georgia
- Capacity: 42,500 (expandable to 71,000, standing room to at least 73,019)
- Owner: Arthur Blank
- Sporting Director: Chris Henderson
- Head coach: Gerardo Martino
- League: Major League Soccer
- 2026: Eastern Conference: 13th Overall: 27th Playoffs: Did not qualify
- Website: atlutd.com
Home colors	Away colors

Atlanta United FC is an American professional soccer club based in Atlanta. The club competes in Major League Soccer (MLS) as a member of the Eastern Conference. Domestically, the club has won one MLS Cup, one U.S. Open Cup, and one Eastern Conference championship. They have also won one Campeones Cup.

Founded in 2014, Atlanta United began play as an MLS expansion team in 2017, as the 22nd team in the league. It is the first MLS franchise to be based in Atlanta, and the club plays home games at Mercedes-Benz Stadium, which they share with the city's National Football League (NFL) franchise, the Atlanta Falcons. The club is operated by Arthur Blank, owner of the Falcons and co-founder of the Home Depot. The club also owns Atlanta United 2, a reserve team that competes in MLS Next Pro.

Gerardo Martino was appointed as the club's first head coach and guided Atlanta to their first playoff appearance in the team's debut season, before securing the team's first trophy in just their second season by winning MLS Cup 2018. After a series of declining seasons under other managers, Martino returned before the 2026 season to coach the team.

Atlanta has set several league records for highest single-match and average attendance. In 2026, Forbes estimated the club was the fourth most valuable in the league, worth approximately $1 billion.

== History ==
=== Initial expansion proposals ===
At the time the team was announced, Atlanta was the largest metropolitan area without an MLS franchise. Atlanta Falcons owner Arthur Blank's AMB Sports and Entertainment Group had submitted a bid for an expansion franchise in 2008, but withdrew the bid in early 2009 due to state and local government budget shortfalls and Blank's inability to find partners to build an appropriate stadium for the proposed team. On July 10, 2010, Dan Courtemanche, MLS's executive vice president of communications, said that despite the bid withdrawal, regular discussions with Blank regarding Atlanta's potential as an expansion market were occurring.

=== MLS expansion bid ===
On May 31, 2011, the NHL's Atlanta Thrashers were sold to True North Sports & Entertainment, who announced that they would relocate the team to Winnipeg and rebrand as the Winnipeg Jets. The Thrashers' relocation helped restart the efforts and talks of bringing an MLS expansion team to Atlanta.

In May 2012, while the Falcons' proposed new stadium was going through the approval process, MLS commissioner Don Garber cited Atlanta as one of three "intriguing" markets for future league expansion. Additionally, when Blank presented his case for a new stadium at the Falcons' annual meeting with season ticket holders, he stated that an additional benefit of the new stadium was that it could help attract a Major League Soccer franchise and potentially host World Cup matches. Later that year, in November, Garber said if the Falcons could complete plans for a new stadium, MLS would "try to figure out how an MLS team could be part of their plans."

Rich McKay, Falcons president and CEO, said in 2013 that the team was "open to various options, including [its] ownership of a team or someone else owning a team". Dan Courtemanche said, "We are big believers in the Atlanta market," and cited the city's growing Hispanic population and corporations that could serve as its sponsors. Then, in March 2013, the city and the Falcons agreed to financing terms, and in May 2013, the Georgia Department of Economic Development board approved $30 million in bonds to finance the land purchase for the new stadium. The stadium was set to open in 2017 and could be configured for professional soccer. Atlanta remained at the top of the list for an MLS expansion team, as Garber, in the December 2013 MLS State of the League address, emphasized that it was a goal to continue to expand in the Southeast, and added, "if we can continue to advance our discussions positively with Arthur [Blank] and the [Atlanta] Falcons, we hope to be able to get a situation finalized so that could potentially be our second team. Orlando being the first, maybe Atlanta or Miami would be the second or the third." In December 2013, Garber said the league was making progress in discussions with the Falcons and that the stadium situation was finalized. Negotiations continued, as Courtemanche said in January 2014 that Atlanta "remains a great prospect for MLS expansion," and in February 2014, Rich McKay confirmed the parties were "far along in negotiations."

On April 16, 2014, Blank announced that MLS had awarded an expansion franchise to his group, and the team would begin play in 2017. Atlanta became the second franchise awarded in the Southeastern United States in five months, following the Orlando City announcement in late 2013. The Southeast had been without an MLS team since the Miami Fusion and Tampa Bay Mutiny were dissolved in 2001.

=== Inaugural season and first championship (2017–2018) ===
Atlanta's first regular season MLS game was played on March 5, 2017, at Bobby Dodd Stadium with 55,297 in attendance. Yamil Asad scored the first goal in team history in a 2–1 loss to New York Red Bulls. A week later, the team registered its first win with a 6–1 away defeat of fellow expansion team Minnesota United FC. On March 18, 2017, the team registered its first win at home, beating Chicago Fire, who went down to ten men in the eleventh minute, 4–0 in front of a sold-out Bobby Dodd Stadium. Following its move to Mercedes-Benz Stadium, the team continued leading the league in attendance and averaged more than 48,000 in its home league matches, breaking records for attendance for a non-doubleheader MLS game and average single-season attendance for a U.S. soccer team. Atlanta clinched a berth in the playoffs, becoming the third MLS expansion team to do so in their inaugural season, by finishing tied for third place in the Eastern Conference; due to tiebreaking rules Atlanta was seeded fourth. In its first playoff game, the team faced Columbus Crew and set a then-MLS attendance record for a playoff game with 67,221 spectators in attendance. After 120 minutes of scoreless action, the match was decided by a penalty shoot-out, which Columbus won 3–1 to eliminate Atlanta.

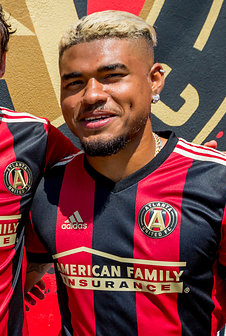
Josef Martínez was MLS MVP as Atlanta won the championship in 2018

In their second season, Atlanta finished second in the Eastern Conference as well as the Supporters' Shield. The club qualified for the playoffs for the second year in a row, advancing to MLS Cup 2018 after beating New York City FC and New York Red Bulls. In the final on December 8, the team beat Portland Timbers, bringing the city of Atlanta its first major sports championship since MLB's Atlanta Braves won the 1995 World Series. The win qualified Atlanta for the 2019 CONCACAF Champions League, marking the first time Atlanta qualified for continental competition.

The win also allowed Martino, who had announced earlier in the season that he would not return for the 2019 campaign, to end his two-year tenure on a high note. Josef Martínez was named league MVP, while Martino was named Coach of the Year.

=== De Boer era (2019–2020) ===
Martino left the club following their MLS Cup triumph in order to take over as manager of the Mexico national team. He was replaced by Frank de Boer. In the second edition of the Campeones Cup, Atlanta defeated Club América 3–2, winning the trophy and becoming the first club from United States to defeat a Mexican side in the cup match. De Boer led the club to wins in both the U.S. Open Cup and Campeones Cup, but after beating the New England Revolution and Philadelphia Union in the MLS Playoffs, Atlanta United were eliminated in the conference finals by Toronto FC.

The 2020 season started brightly for United, with two wins in two matches before the season was postponed due to the COVID-19 pandemic. Following a nearly four-month layoff, United participated in the MLS is Back Tournament in Orlando, Florida, losing all three of their matches. Following their elimination from the MLS is Back Tournament, De Boer and Atlanta United mutually agreed to end his relationship with the club. He was replaced on an interim basis by Stephen Glass, who led the club following the resumption of league play in August.

=== Decline and subsequent rebuild (2021–2025) ===
At the end of 2020, former Argentina international defender Gabriel Heinze signed a two-year contract to be the next head coach.

During the offseason prior to the 2021 MLS season, Atlanta United brought in 9 new players including Santiago Sosa and veteran striker Lisandro López.

On April 6, 2021, United played their first game of the 2021 season, beating Costa Rican side Alajuelense 1–0 in the away leg of a CONCACAF Champions League tie. The match marked the return of striker Josef Martínez, who had missed the entirety of the 2020 season due to a torn ACL. On April 13, Atlanta United again beat Alajuelense 1–0, advancing 2–0 on aggregate to the quarterfinals of the CONCACAF Champions League. In their largest home defeat to date, they lost the first leg of the quarterfinals to Philadelphia Union on April 27, 2021, by a score of 3–0. On July 18, Atlanta United announced the firing of head coach Gabriel Heinze, after the team hit a club-record eight-game winless streak, with only two wins out of their first thirteen games of the 2021 MLS season. Heinze's interim replacement was Atlanta United assistant coach Rob Valentino. On August 12, former Mexican international and Seattle Sounders FC assistant coach Gonzalo Pineda was named the fourth permanent head coach in club history, with his first match away to D.C. United on August 21. Valentino remained with the club as an assistant coach. On November 7, Atlanta United clinched a spot in the 2021 MLS Cup Playoffs after a 2–1 victory over FC Cincinnati at TQL Stadium. They were then knocked out in the first round by New York City FC.

Atlanta United finished 11th in the Eastern Conference in the 2022 season and did not qualify for the playoffs. Atlanta United participated in the 2022 U.S. Open Cup as defending champions, as the 2020 and 2021 editions of tournament were canceled due to the COVID-19 pandemic. They were knocked out in the Round of 32 by Nashville SC. At the end of the season, after winning the award for the 2022 MLS Goal of the Year, Josef Martínez did not renew his contract with Atlanta United, subsequently leaving the club after six seasons.

Atlanta United finished 6th in the Eastern Conference in the 2022 season and were knocked out in Round One of the MLS Cup Playoffs by the Columbus Crew. Atlanta United competed in the U.S. Open Cup, and also participated in the Leagues Cup for the first time in their history. They were knocked out of the U.S. Open Cup in the Third Round by Memphis 901 FC, and were knocked out of the Leagues Cup in the group stage. Their top scorer in all competitions was Giorgos Giakoumakis with 19 goals.

On June 3, 2024, Atlanta United announced the firing of head coach Gonzalo Pineda, after the team lost a club-record 5 consecutive home matches. Pineda's interim replacement is Atlanta United assistant coach Rob Valentino, who led the team as an interim head coach after Gabriel Heinze was fired in 2021. In the summer transfer window, Atlanta sold Thiago Almada for a reported fee of $22 million, plus $3 million in add-ons; which broke the transfer record for the MLS. They also sold Giorgos Giakoumakis and Caleb Wiley, which resulted in Atlanta United having over $50 million to spend in the summer transfer window. Atlanta United finished ninth in the eastern conference, allowing the team to qualify for the wild card round of the 2024 MLS Cup playoffs. After defeating CF Montréal in the wild card round, Atlanta United upset Supporters' Shield winners Inter Miami, who had also set a league record points total, in round one of the playoffs after winning the second and third matches of the best of three series. Atlanta United were then eliminated by rivals Orlando City in the following round. On December 20, 2024, Atlanta United announced the hiring of Ronny Deila as head coach. On February 4, 2025, Atlanta United announced the signing of Emmanuel Latte Lath from Middlesbrough for a reported $22 million with a contract through 2028 with an option for 2029 and would occupy a designated player spot on the roster. The signing made Latte Lath the most expensive signing in league history.

At the end of the 2025 season, Brad Guzan announced his retirement from professional play, departing Atlanta as the longest serving captain and possessing the all-time appearances record for the club.

Following the conclusion of the 2025 MLS season in which Atlanta finished 14th in the Eastern Conference, their worst in club history, Deila was sacked by the club.

=== Return of Tata Martino (2026–present) ===
On 6 November 2025, Tata Martino returned to Atlanta United as head coach, signing a two-year contract through 2027.

In the subsequent transfer window following the arrival of Martino, and the resignation of club CEO Garth Lagerwey due to his declining health, the club let go of players such as Brooks Lennon, Bartosz Slisz, and Noah Cobb. In turn, they would supplement the losses with new players such as Tomás Jacob and Lucas Hoyos.

== Colors and badge ==
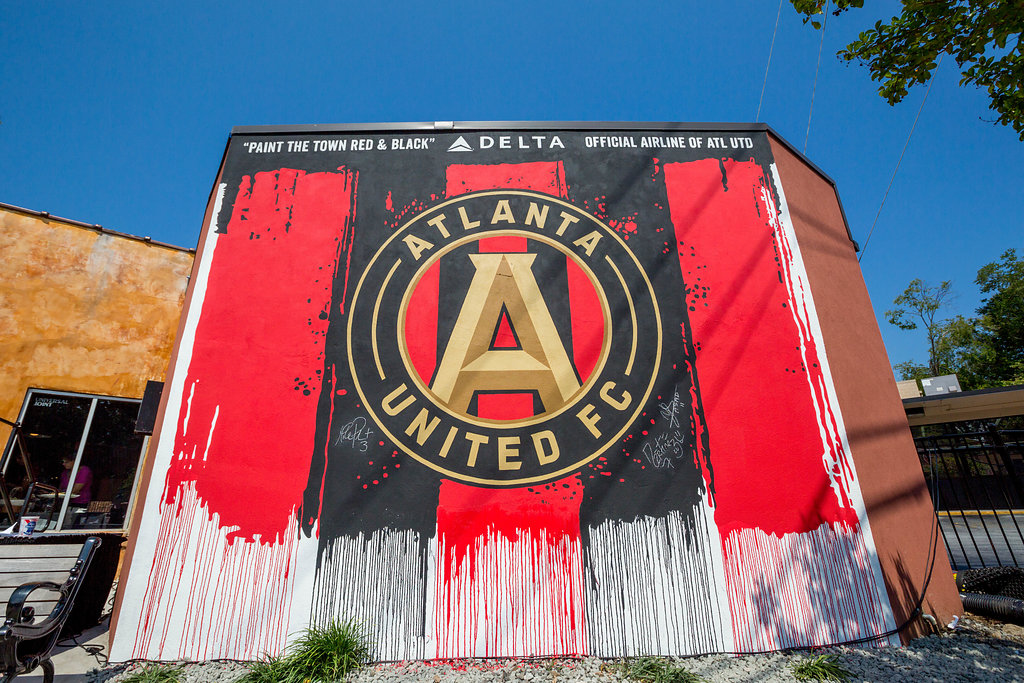
An Atlanta United mural located in Decatur, Georgia

Arthur Blank stated that fans would be involved in choosing the name, logo and "a color scheme that'll work with the red and black with ... gold " (the colors used by the Falcons when they launched in 1966).

On June 25, 2015, Sports Illustrated reported that Atlanta's expansion team would be named Atlanta United FC. The official announcement of the team's name took place on July 7. Atlanta United president Darren Eales explained that the name was chosen based on a survey of the team's supporters and used words the supporters most positively related to the potential team. Eales also stated that the Founders' Group meeting would still be held on July 7 and the logo for the new team would be unveiled.

=== Symbols ===
The team's name, logo and colors were unveiled on July 7, 2015. The logo features a circle reminiscent of the city's seal and Olympic heritage with a bold "A" at the center of the circle. Behind the "A" are five black and red stripes representing the five pillars of the team: unity, determination, community, excellence, and innovation. The team's official colors are black (for strength and power), red (or "Victory Red," as the team calls it, for pride and passion), and gold (for a commitment to excellence). The team has become unofficially known as "The Five Stripes", which correlates to the five stripes on the team's inaugural home kits.

=== Kits ===
In February 2019, on the heels of the club's first MLS championship, Atlanta unveiled a new primary kit for the upcoming 2019 season. The new design is nicknamed "Star and Stripes" and was created by Adidas. Changes include a move from five thick stripes to nine thinner stripes on the front, red socks instead of black, and a gold star above the team crest.

In February 2021, Atlanta United announced a new primary kit for the 2021 season. The design is named the "BLVCK" kit and is United's first all-black kit.

==== Primary ====
2017–2018	2019–2020	2021–2022	2023–2024

==== Alternate ====
2017	2017 Away Alt	2018–2019	2020–2021	2022–2023	2024–2025

==== Third ====
2021	2023

=== Sponsorship ===
Season	Kit sponsor	Shirt sponsor	Sleeve sponsor
2016	Adidas	American Family Insurance	—
2017–2020	Adidas	American Family Insurance	—
2020	Adidas	American Family Insurance	Piedmont Hospital
2020	Adidas	American Family Insurance	Truist Financial
2021	Adidas	American Family Insurance	AT&T
2022–2024	Adidas	American Family Insurance	Piedmont Hospital
2025–present	Adidas	American Family Insurance	Emory Healthcare

On July 12, 2016, the team announced American Family Insurance as its primary jersey sponsor for the first team. The terms and length of the contract were not disclosed. Truist Financial is the official kit sponsor at the youth academy level. On February 4, 2020, the club announced that it had expanded its partnership with local healthcare provider Piedmont Healthcare. As part of the partnership expansion, Piedmont became the first team's sleeve sponsor and the main sponsor for the reserve team. Later, the team announced Truist and NAPA as short and sleeve sponsors. On March 23, 2021, the team announced AT&T as its new sleeve sponsor.

== Development system ==
=== Reserve team ===
On November 14, 2017, Atlanta United announced that they would be launching a reserve team to compete in the United Soccer League, the second division of American soccer. Club president Darren Eales said that the new team was launched to "bridge the gap between our best in class academy and our First Team." The team, Atlanta United 2, began play in the Eastern Conference of what is now called USL Championship in the 2018 season. In 2023, the team was moved to MLS Next Pro.

=== Youth academy ===
Atlanta United operate a youth academy that competes in MLS NEXT. The academy began play in the 2016–2017 USSDA season and has seven youth teams: U-19, U-17, U-16, U-15, U-14, U-13 and U-12. Participation in the academy is free for all players and participants are eligible to be signed to the Atlanta United first team as a Homegrown Player. The club has signed six players to first-team contracts and three players to reserve team contracts since the academy launched.

In addition to its MLS NEXT programs, the academy also operates a soccer development program to identify players playing for local youth clubs and promote them to the academy. The club also operates the Atlanta United Regional Development School, a pre-academy feeder program for players aged 8–14 to provide training and development for advanced local players and identify potential academy players, as well as the United Juniors Program, a special development program to provide supplemental development for U-12 players playing for other Atlanta-area youth clubs.

== Stadium and team facilities ==
=== Home stadiums ===
Name	Location	Years
Bobby Dodd Stadium	Atlanta, Georgia	2017
Mercedes-Benz Stadium	Atlanta, Georgia	2017–present
Fifth Third Bank Stadium	Kennesaw, Georgia	2017–present; 4 matches in U.S. Open Cup, 3 matches in CONCACAF Champions League

=== Mercedes-Benz Stadium ===
==== Capacity and atmosphere ====
The club shares Mercedes-Benz Stadium with the NFL's Atlanta Falcons. The club typically curtains off the upper level of the stadium to create a more intimate atmosphere for soccer. For most games, Mercedes-Benz Stadium holds 42,500 people. The team used the curtains for six of nine home matches during the inaugural season. When expanded to full capacity, the stadium can hold 71,000 people, with standing room for at least 73,019 people (based on attendance at MLS Cup 2018—at the time, the largest single-match crowd in MLS history). To create a better match-day experience, stands are retractable to accommodate a larger field and allow better sight lines. When Atlanta was announced as an expansion team, Blank vowed, "There will never be an MLS game in Atlanta where NFL lines are shown on the field."

==== Construction delays ====
In January 2016, the opening of the stadium was delayed three months to June 2017. The team was originally scheduled to move into Mercedes-Benz Stadium on July 30, 2017; however, the complexity of the eight-panel retractable roof caused another delay in the stadium's opening. As the team could not use Bobby Dodd Stadium in August due to Georgia Tech having priority, the rivalry match against Orlando City SC was moved up one day from July 30 to 29, and two home fixtures originally scheduled to be held at Mercedes-Benz Stadium in August were moved to September. The team's first match in the stadium took place on September 10, 2017, against FC Dallas.

=== Training facilities and team headquarters ===
In August 2015, the club announced plans for training facilities, academy facilities, and sporting headquarters in Decatur. However, the results of an environmental and geotechnical feasibility study found that the site on Memorial Drive was unfeasible, and in November 2015 plans for the facility were canceled. Instead, the facility was built on a 33-acre plot on Franklin Gateway in Marietta. On April 11, 2017, the $60 million facility was opened, named the Children's Healthcare of Atlanta Training Ground. The facility includes a 30,000 square foot building that acts as the club's sporting headquarters and houses locker rooms for the first team, reserve team, and academy teams, a full-service dining hall, and sports science facilities including a gymnasium and two hydrotherapy plunge pools. The facility also includes six outdoor training fields, including a showcase field with a stand that can seat 2,500 spectators. On March 28, 2019, the Marietta City Council agreed to sell an additional 17 acres (6.9 ha) of land to the club to expand the training facilities as well as extend the lease on the existing facility on city-owned land by an additional five years.

=== Bobby Dodd Stadium ===
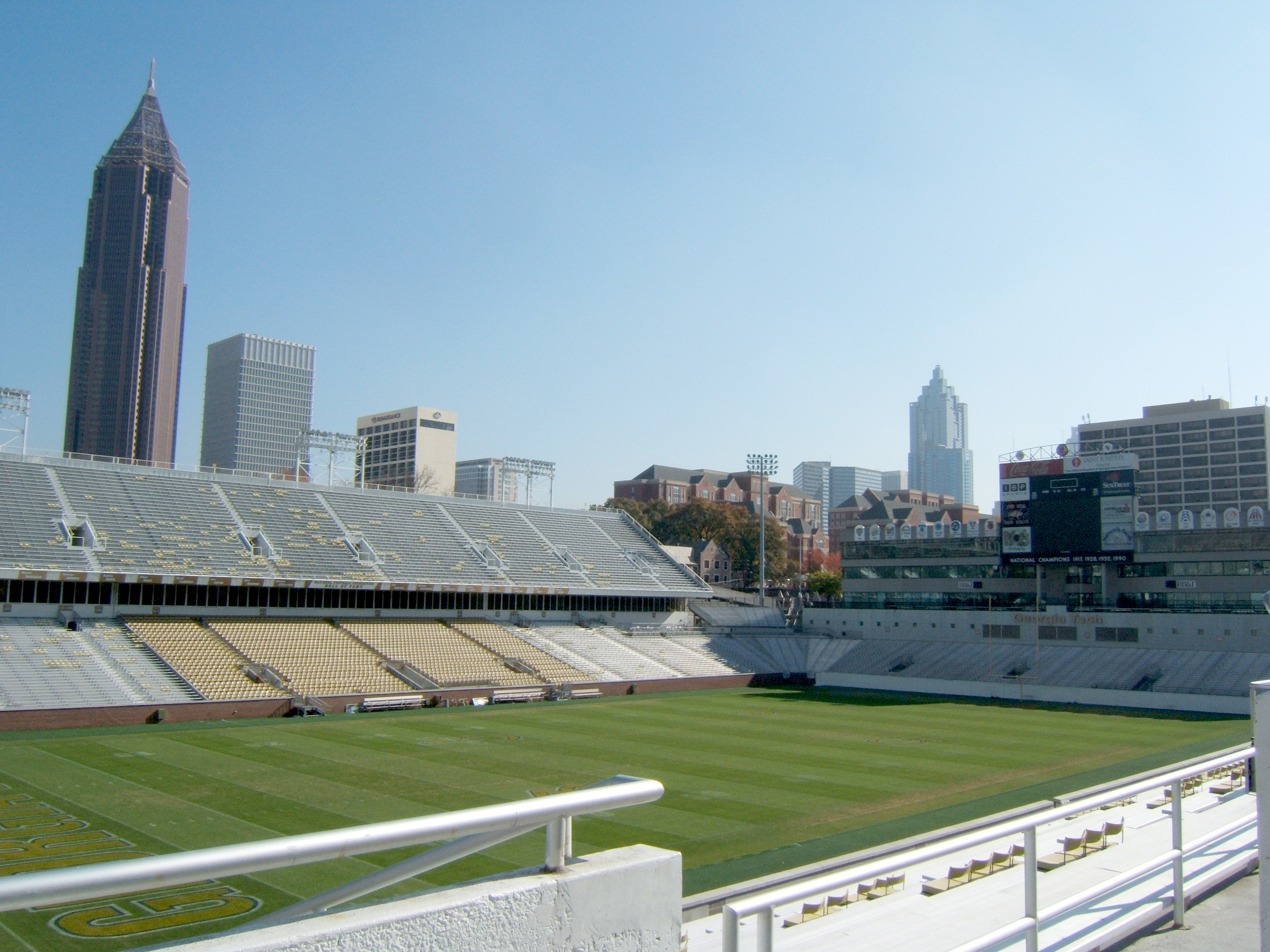
Bobby Dodd Stadium, where Atlanta United played part of its inaugural season in 2017.

The first team played its home matches in the first half of the 2017 MLS season at Georgia Tech's Bobby Dodd Stadium due to delays in the construction of Mercedes-Benz Stadium. Although the club sought a balanced home-and-away schedule during their spell at Bobby Dodd Stadium, Atlanta United did not play any home matches from March 19 to April 29 to avoid conflicts with the Yellow Jackets' spring football scrimmages. According to club officials, the Georgia Dome was not considered a viable option to temporarily host the team, since delaying the Dome's planned demolition would have also delayed the completion of Mercedes-Benz Stadium.

== Club culture ==
=== Rivalries ===
Atlanta United's traditional rivalry is against fellow expansion club Orlando City SC. The two clubs are the first MLS expansion teams in the southeastern US since the folding of Tampa Bay Munity and Miami Fusion in 2002. From the beginning, the series has seen several fan incidents as well as player and front office animosity including both teams banning the others' supporters groups.

Atlanta United also shares regional rivalries with Nashville SC, Charlotte FC, and Inter Miami.

=== Supporters ===
Atlanta United fans as a whole are often referred to as the "17s," a reference to the inaugural year of the club. Supporter jerseys display the number 17 with either "Atlanta" or the supporter's name across the back. Atlanta United has six officially recognized supporter groups: Terminus Legion, Resurgence, Footie Mob, The Faction, LA 12 de Atlanta, and All Stripes.

Terminus Legion was created in March 2011 by a local graphic designer in the early days of the move to bring an MLS team to Atlanta. The group was named after the name given to Atlanta when it was first settled, and its logo featuring a cow catcher and railroad ties reflect the city's history as a locomotive hub.

Footie Mob was established in 2014, and the name is a take on Atlanta hip-hop group Goodie Mob. The group is known for pre-game tailgating and incorporating Atlanta's music culture into the supporter culture.

Resurgence was founded by a group of friends at local Atlanta soccer bar Brewhouse Café.

All Stripes is an LGBTQ+ supporter group, established in 2017, that became official in 2022.

La 12 de Atlanta is a supporters group, established in 2016, that celebrates Latino culture and influence in soccer. La 12 also became an official supporters group in 2022.

The Faction was founded in 2015, during that year's Women's World Cup, and is intended to be a less "European"-influenced supporter group.

By December 2015, the supporters of the new MLS team had already pledged to purchase more than 29,000 season tickets. As of December 2017, the team had more than 36,000 season ticket holders.

In 2018, the Bleacher Report declared Atlanta the "Black Soccer Capital of America" due to the emerging presence of African-Americans supporting Atlanta United.

=== Attendance ===
On September 12, 2017, Atlanta United announced that the team had sold more than 69,256 tickets for the September 16 match against Orlando City SC at Mercedes-Benz Stadium, breaking the league record for single-match attendance. The previous record of 69,255 tickets sold was held by the LA Galaxy. The game's official attendance was 70,425, making Atlanta the first MLS team to surpass 70,000 in attendance for a non-doubleheader match.

On October 5, 2017, the team announced they had sold more than 70,456 tickets for the October 22 match against Toronto FC. This allowed the team to break both the record for highest average attendance in a season for MLS (held by Seattle Sounders FC), as well as the record for highest average attendance in a season for professional soccer in the United States, which was held by New York Cosmos. The game's official attendance was 71,874, which broke the MLS single-match attendance record for a second time. Atlanta finished the season with an average attendance of 48,200 for MLS regular season games, a number higher than that of multiple major clubs such as English sides Everton and Chelsea.

On March 11, 2018, the team broke the league single-match attendance record for the third time, selling 72,035 tickets for their 2018 season home opener against D.C. United.

On June 30, 2018, fans set another record with 71,932 in attendance, more than any other soccer game happening that day in the world, including the 2018 FIFA World Cup in Russia.

On July 15, 2018, the team again set the league single-match attendance record with 72,243 in attendance.

Atlanta broke the league record for average regular-season attendance again in 2018, breaking their 2017 record and becoming the first MLS team to average more than 50,000 in attendance with an average attendance of 53,002.

On December 8, 2018, Atlanta United won its first MLS Cup before a crowd of 73,019, the largest non-doubleheader crowd in league history.

On August 3, 2019, the team set another single-match attendance record, with 72,548 in attendance for their home matchup against the LA Galaxy.

=== Traditions ===
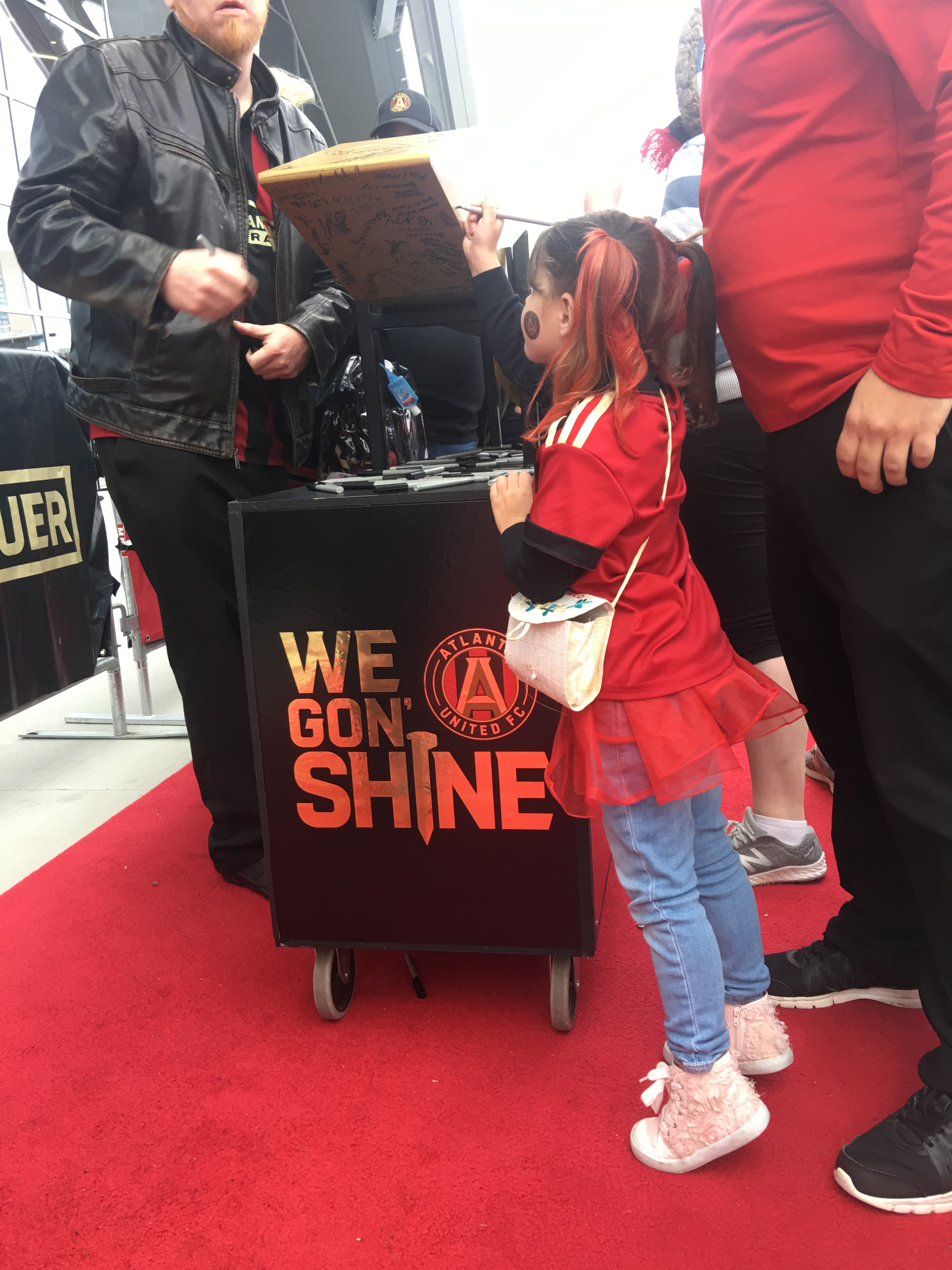
A fan signs the Golden Spike prior to the game on November 11, 2018

During their inaugural season, Atlanta United introduced a ritual called the Golden Spike in a nod to the city's railroad history. Prior to the game, players and supporters sign a large golden railroad spike, which is then marched into the stadium by supporters and hammered into a platform by a local VIP while the crowd chants "A-T-L!" Additionally, after each Atlanta United win, the player voted as the Man of the Match hammers a spike. Local celebrities that took part in the Golden Spike tradition during 2017 included hip hop artists 2 Chainz, Yung Joc, and Waka Flocka, as well as country musician Zac Brown, retired Atlanta Braves star Andruw Jones, and Atlanta basketball players Tiffany Hayes and Dennis Schröder. Atlanta native rap artist Archie Eversole also participated in the Golden Spike tradition and would later compose a rap anthem for the club entitled "United We Conquer." In 2018, notable celebrity participants included singer T-Pain, Dutch soccer legend Edgar Davids, Atlanta multi-sports star Brian Jordan, boxing legend Evander Holyfield and his son Elijah Holyfield, and rappers Jeezy, Killer Mike, and Big Boi. At MLS Cup 2018, owner Arthur Blank hammered the Spike. 2019 saw celebrities such as wrestling legend Ric Flair, Hollywood icon Ron Howard, hip hop group Goodie Mob, and basketball star Dikembe Mutombo participate in the tradition.

The first signing of the Golden Spike at Mercedes-Benz Stadium, September 10, 2017.

== Ownership and management ==
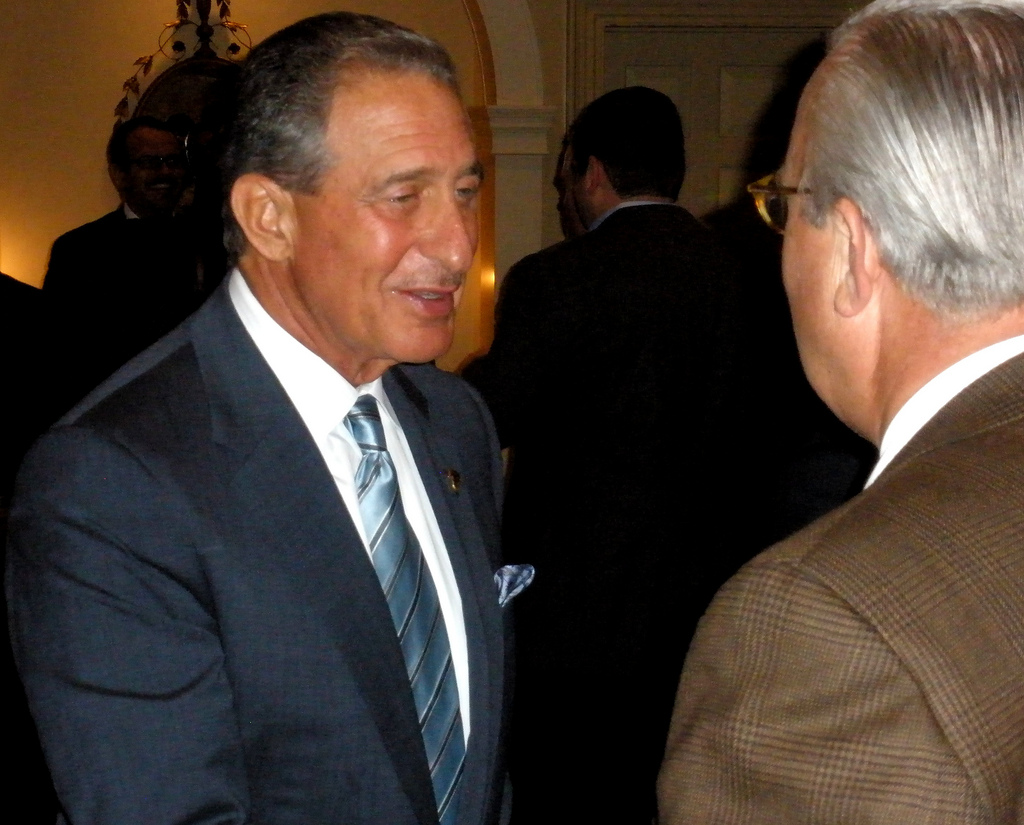
Arthur Blank owns the club.

Atlanta United FC's principal owner is Arthur Blank, co-founder of Home Depot. It is a component of AMB Sports & Entertainment, a subsidiary of the Blank Family of Businesses that also includes the NFL's Atlanta Falcons and Mercedes-Benz Stadium.

== Players ==
=== Roster ===
As of September 3, 2026

Note: Flags indicate national team as defined under FIFA eligibility rules; some limited exceptions apply. Players may hold more than one non-FIFA nationality.

No.	Pos.	Nation	Player
1	GK	ARG	Lucas Hoyos
3	DF	ARG	Elías Báez
4	DF	ALB	Enea Mihaj
6	DF	PAR	Júnior Alonso
7	MF	COL	Steven Alzate
8	MF	FRA	Tristan Muyumba
10	FW	PAR	Miguel Almirón (captain; DP)
11	MF	ARG	Giuliano Galoppo (on loan from River Plate)
14	MF	URU	Mauricio Amaro
16	MF	USA	Adrian Gill
19	FW	BRA	Sérgio Santos
20	FW	USA	Luke Brennan (HG)
22	FW	HAI	Fafà Picault

No.	Pos.	Nation	Player
27	DF	CHI	Paulo Díaz
28	MF	USA	Will Reilly (HG)
30	FW	JPN	Cayman Togashi
35	MF	TTO	Jay Fortune (HG)
36	FW	SUI	Breel Embolo (DP)
40	MF	VEN	Santiago Pita (HG)
42	GK	CAN	Jayden Hibbert
47	DF	USA	Matthew Edwards (HG)
48	MF	USA	Cooper Sanchez (HG)
50	DF	USA	Dominik Chong-Qui (HG)
55	MF	ARG	Tomás Jacob
59	MF	RUS	Aleksei Miranchuk (DP)

=== Out on loan ===
Note: Flags indicate national team as defined under FIFA eligibility rules; some limited exceptions apply. Players may hold more than one non-FIFA nationality.

No.	Pos.	Nation	Player
9	FW	CIV	Emmanuel Latte Lath (DP; on loan to Union Berlin)
23	MF	PUR	Adyn Torres (HG; on loan to Nõmme United)
95	DF	USA	Kaiden Moore (HG; on loan to Philadelphia Union)
—	FW	JAM	Ashton Gordon (on loan to Chattanooga FC)

=== Reserved numbers ===
On February 10, 2017, Atlanta United announced that the number 17 would be reserved for the fans. The number marks the year of the team's inaugural season in MLS. "Atlanta United aims to recognize that from the very beginning, the fans, the city, and the people define the spirit and essence of this club," the team explained in the official statement regarding the number's dedication.

=== Notable players ===
- Thiago Almada
- Miguel Almirón
- Luiz Araújo
- Esequiel Barco
- Leandro González Pírez
- Julian Gressel
- Brad Guzan
- Jeff Larentowicz
- Josef Martínez
- Pity Martínez
- Darlington Nagbe
- Michael Parkhurst
- Miles Robinson
- Héctor Villalba
- Anton Walkes

== Staff ==
=== Coaching staff ===
Role	Name	Nationality
Head coach	Gerardo Martino	Argentina
Assistant coach	Jorge Theiler	Argentina
Assistant coach	Gerardo Martino Jr.	Argentina
Assistant coach	Rodrigo Ríos	Chile
Goalkeeping coach	Elliot Parish	England
Fitness coach	Manuel Alfaro	Argentina
Fitness coach	Rodolfo Paladini	Argentina
Head video analyst	Gauthier Vanderloock	Belgium
Video analyst	Mac Orr	United States
Director, High Performance	David Tenney	United States
Head athletic trainer	Sean Cropper	United States
Head of sports science & performance analytics	John Abbott	United States
Strength and conditioning	Jordan Day	England
Assistant athletic trainer	Greg Gandy	United States
Assistant athletic trainer	Juan Rios	Mexico
Physical therapist – First Team	Mario Cruz	United States
Massage therapist – First Team	Sam Foster	United States
Performance dietician	Kara Lynch	United States

=== Club executives ===
Role	Name	Nationality
Owner and chairman, Blank Family of businesses	Arthur Blank	United States
Chief executive officer, Arthur M. Blank sports and entertainment	Rich McKay	United States
President and CEO	vacant	
Chief soccer officer and Sporting director	Chris Henderson	United States
Senior vice president of strategy	Dimitrios Efstathiou	Greece
Club ambassador and Sporting advisor	Brad Guzan	United States

President history
Coach	Country	Start	End
Darren Eales	(England)	September 10, 2014	August 24, 2022
Garth Lagerway	(United States)	November 22, 2022	December 1, 2025

Head coach history
Coach	Country	Start	End
Gerardo "Tata" Martino	(Argentina)	September 27, 2016	December 10, 2018
Frank de Boer	(Netherlands)	December 23, 2018	July 24, 2020
Stephen Glass (interim)	(Scotland)	July 27, 2020	December 12, 2020
Gabriel Heinze	(Argentina)	December 18, 2020	July 18, 2021
Rob Valentino (interim)	(United States)	July 18, 2021	August 12, 2021
Gonzalo Pineda	(Mexico)	August 12, 2021	June 3, 2024
Rob Valentino (interim)	(United States)	June 3, 2024	November 26, 2024
Ronny Deila	(Norway)	December 20, 2024	October 19, 2025
Gerardo "Tata" Martino	(Argentina)	November 5, 2025	present

== Honors ==
=== Domestic ===
- MLS Cup
  - Champions (1): 2018
- U.S. Open Cup
  - Champions (1): 2019
- Supporters' Shield
  - Runners-up (2): 2018, 2019
- Eastern Conference (Playoff)
  - Champions (1): 2018
  - Runners-up (1): 2019
- Eastern Conference (Regular Season)
  - Runners-up (2): 2018, 2019

=== International ===
- Campeones Cup
  - Champions (1): 2019

== Records ==
=== Seasons ===
This is a partial list of the seasons completed by Atlanta. For the full season-by-season history, see List of Atlanta United FC seasons.

Season	League								Position		Playoffs	USOC	Continental		Other		Top goalscorer(s) (Note: Top goalscorer(s) includes all goals scored in the regular season, MLS Cup Playoffs, U.S. Open Cup, MLS is Back Tournament, CONCACAF Champions League, FIFA Club World Cup, and other competitive continental matches.)	
Season	Pld	W	L	D	GF	GA	GD	Pts	Conf.	Overall	Playoffs	USOC	CCC	LC	Other		Name(s)	Goals
**2017**	34	15	9	10	70	40	+30	55	4th	4th	R1	Ro16	DNQ	—	—	—	(Venezuela) Josef Martínez	20
**2018**	34	21	7	6	70	44	+26	69	2nd	2nd	W	Ro16	DNQ	—	—	—	(Venezuela) Josef Martínez	35♦ (Note: Martínez won the MLS Golden Boot (31 goals).)
**2019**	34	18	12	4	58	43	+15	58	2nd	3rd	SF	W	QF	DNQ	Campeones Cup	W	(Venezuela) Josef Martínez	33
**2020**	23	6	13	4	23	30	−7	22	12th	23rd	DNQ	NH	QF	NH	MLS is Back	GS	(Republic of Ireland) Jon Gallagher (Argentina) Pity Martínez	4
**2021**	34	13	9	12	45	37	+8	51	5th	9th	R1	NH	QF	DNQ	—	—	(Venezuela) Josef Martínez	12
**2022**	34	10	14	10	48	54	−6	40	11th	23rd	DNQ	R4	DNQ	NH	—	—	(Venezuela) Josef Martínez	9
**2023**	34	13	9	12	66	53	+13	51	6th	10th	R1	GS	DNQ	GS	—	—	(Greece) Giorgos Giakoumakis	17
**2024**	34	10	14	10	46	49	−3	40	9th	20th	QF	QF	DNQ	GS	—	—	(Georgia (country)) Saba Lobzhanidze	11
2025	34	5	13	16	38	63	−25	28	14th	29th	DNQ	DNQ	DNQ	GS			(Ivory Coast) Emmanuel Latte Lath	7
Total	261	111	100	84	426	413	+51	414	—	—	—	—	—	—	—	—	(Venezuela) **Josef Martínez**	**111**

=== International competitions ===
Competition	Season	Round	Opposition	Home	Away	Aggregate
CONCACAF Champions League	2019	Round of 16	(Costa Rica) Herediano	4–0	1–3	**5–3**
CONCACAF Champions League	2019	Quarterfinals	(Mexico) Monterrey	1–0	0–3	**1–3**
CONCACAF Champions League	2020	Round of 16	(Honduras) Motagua	3–0	1–1	**4–1**
CONCACAF Champions League	2020	Quarterfinals	(Mexico) América	1–0	0–3	**1–3**
CONCACAF Champions League	2021	Round of 16	(Costa Rica) Alajuelense	1–0	1–0	**2–0**
CONCACAF Champions League	2021	Quarterfinals	(United States) Philadelphia Union	0–3	1–1	1–4
Campeones Cup	2019	Final	(Mexico) América	**3–2**		
Leagues Cup	2023	Group Stage	(United States) Inter Miami	0–4		
Leagues Cup	2023	Group Stage	(Mexico) Cruz Azul	1–1 (4–5p)		
Leagues Cup	2024	Group Stage	(United States) D.C. United	3–3 (5–6p)		
Leagues Cup	2024	Group Stage	(Mexico) Santos Laguna	0–0 (3–5p)		
Leagues Cup	2025	League Stage	(Mexico) Necaxa	1–3		
Leagues Cup	2025	League Stage	(Mexico) UNAM	2–3		
Leagues Cup	2025	League Stage	(Mexico) Atlas	4–1		

=== Player appearances ===
#	Pos.	Name	Nation	Career	MLS	Playoffs	USOC	INTL	Total
1	Goalkeeper	Brad Guzan	United States	2017–2025	225	18	4	15	262
2	Defender	Brooks Lennon	United States	2020–2025	171	6	8	10	195
3	Forward	Josef Martínez	Venezuela	2017–2022	134	10	3	11	158
4	Defender	Miles Robinson	United States	2017–2023	123	6	9	12	150
5	Midfielder	Jeff Larentowicz	United States	2017–2020	113	8	3	8	132
6	Midfielder	Julian Gressel	United States	2017–2019	98	9	7	4	118
7	Defender	Leandro González Pírez	Argentina	2017–2019	95	9	7	4	115
8	Midfielder	Esequiel Barco	Argentina	2018–2023	81	9	5	12	107
9	Midfielder	**Miguel Almirón**	Paraguay	2017–2019, 2025–	93	6	2	2	103
10	Defender	Michael Parkhurst	United States	2017–2019	86	8	2	4	100

As of February 14, 2026
USOC = U.S. Open Cup; INTL = CONCACAF Champions League, Campeones Cup, Leagues Cup
Bolded players are currently on the Atlanta United FC roster.

=== Goals ===
#	Pos.	Name	Nation	Career	MLS	Playoffs	USOC	INTL	Total
1	Forward	Josef Martínez	Venezuela	2017–2022	98	5	2	6	111
2	Midfielder	**Miguel Almirón**	Paraguay	2017–2018, 2025–	27	1	0	0	28
3	Midfielder	Thiago Almada	Argentina	2022–2024	23	1	1	1	26
4	Forward	Giorgos Giakoumakis	Greece	2023–2024	22	2	0	0	24
5	Forward	Héctor Villalba	Paraguay	2017–2019	21	1	0	0	22
6	Midfielder	Julian Gressel	United States	2017–2019	15	2	1	2	20
7	Midfielder	Esequiel Barco	Argentina	2018–2023	17	0	1	1	19
8	Midfielder	**Saba Lobzhanidze**	Georgia	2023–	12	1	0	2	15
9	Midfielder	Marcelino Moreno	Argentina	2020–2023	13	0	1	0	14
9	Forward	Jamal Thiaré	Senegal	2023–2025	11	2	0	1	14

As of February 14, 2026

USOC = U.S. Open Cup; INTL = CONCACAF Champions League, Campeones Cup, Leagues Cup
Bolded players are currently on the Atlanta United FC roster.
