= 2023 Atlanta United 2 season =

Atlanta United 2
2023 season
- Owner: Arthur Blank
- President: Garth Lagerwey
- Head coach: Steve Cooke
- Stadium: Fifth Third Bank Stadium
- MLS Next Pro: 10th Eastern; 19th Overall
- MLS Next Pro Playoffs: DNQ
- Top goalscorer: Nicolas Firmino (16)
Home colors	Away colors
- All statistics correct as of September 30, 2023.

The 2023 Atlanta United 2 season was the team's sixth year of existence as well as their first season in MLS Next Pro, the third tier of the American soccer pyramid.

== Club ==
Squad no.	Name	Nationality	Position(s)	Date of birth (age)	Previous club	Apps	Goals
Contracted Players
3	Fuad Adeniyi	(England)	MF	November 15, 1994 (age 31)	(United States) Tormenta FC	14	0
5	Toni Tiente	(Cameroon)	MF	October 25, 1997 (age 28)	(United States) Kalonji Pro-Profile	45	0
6	Nelson Orji	(Nigeria)	DF	April 5, 2002 (age 23)	(Portugal) Porto Academy	36	3
7	Luke Brennan	(United States)	MF	February 24, 2005 (age 21)	(United States) Atlanta United Academy	53	6
8	Nicolas Firmino	(Brazil)	MF	January 30, 2001 (age 25)	(United States) Union Omaha	61	19
9	Karim Tmimi	(France)	FW	August 8, 1996 (age 29)	(United States) Georgia Gwinnett College	26	6
10	Jonantan Villal	(Mexico)	MF	January 6, 2005 (age 21)	(United States) Atlanta United Academy	38	1
11	David Mejía	(Peru)	MF	August 23, 2003 (age 22)	(United States) Atlanta United Academy	60	8
14	Kofi Twumasi	(Ghana)	MF	August 30, 1996 (age 29)	(Germany) VfB Homberg	27	1
15	Matías Gallardo	(Argentina)	MF	November 24, 2003 (age 22)	(Argentina) River Plate Academy	5	0
16	Chris Gloster	(United States)	DF	July 28, 2000 (age 25)	(United States) New York City	7	0
18	Alan Carleton	(United States)	MF	March 20, 2005 (age 20)	(United States) Atlanta United Academy	31	0
22	Sebastián Guerra	(Colombia)	GK	January 8, 2001 (age 25)	(Colombia) Atlético Nacional	5	0
33	Tyler Young	(United States)	MF	December 11, 2000 (age 25)	(United States) Campbell University	8	0
34	Emenike Nwogu	(Nigeria)	MF	August 25, 2003 (age 22)	(Nigeria) Superstar Football Academy	5	0
39	Adyn Torres	(United States)	MF	November 13, 2007 (age 18)	(United States) Atlanta United Academy	10	0
Players Loaned From Atlanta United
2	Ronald Hernández	(Venezuela)	DF	September 21, 1997 (age 28)	(Scotland) Aberdeen	3	0
4	Efrain Morales	(Bolivia)	DF	March 4, 2004 (age 22)	(United States) Atlanta United Academy	54	2
20	Justin Garces	(United States)	GK	August 23, 2000 (age 25)	(United States) UCLA	24	0
21	Erik Centeno	(United States)	MF	June 29, 2002 (age 23)	(United States) University of the Pacific	56	1
24	Noah Cobb	(United States)	DF	July 20, 2005 (age 20)	(United States) Atlanta United Academy	55	3
25	Clément Diop	(Cameroon)	GK	October 13, 1993 (age 32)	(United States) New England Revolution	5	0
28	Tyler Wolff	(United States)	MF	February 13, 2003 (age 23)	(United States) Atlanta United Academy	17	7
30	Machop Chol	(South Sudan)	MF	November 14, 1998 (age 27)	(United States) Atlanta United Academy	8	2
35	Ajani Fortune	(Trinidad and Tobago)	MF	December 30, 2002 (age 23)	(United States) Atlanta United Academy	69	4
36	Jackson Conway	(United States)	FW	December 3, 2001 (age 24)	(United States) Atlanta United Academy	88	28
77	Derrick Etienne	(Haiti)	MF	November 25, 1996 (age 29)	(United States) Columbus Crew	1	0
85	Osvaldo Alonso	(Cuba)	MF	November 11, 1985 (age 40)	(United States) Minnesota United FC	1	0
Academy Call-Ups
38	Shawn Lanza	(United States)	DF	March 19, 2006 (age 19)	(United States) Atlanta United Academy	15	0
40	Matthew Dejianne	(United States)	FW	November 27, 2006 (age 19)	(United States) Atlanta United Academy	3	0
41	Jonathan Ransom	(United States)	GK	January 8, 2008 (age 18)	(United States) Atlanta United Academy	0	0
42	Remi Okunlola	(United States)	MF	June 22, 2005 (age 20)	(United States) Atlanta United Academy	4	0
43	Andrew de Gannes	(Trinidad and Tobago)	DF	April 9, 2003 (age 22)	(United States) Atlanta United Academy	4	0
45	Joel Gonzalez	(United States)	DF	January 21, 2005 (age 21)	(United States) Atlanta United Academy	0	0
46	Mathieu Brick	(United States)	DF	January 10, 2005 (age 21)	(United States) Atlanta United Academy	5	0
48	Cooper Sanchez	(United States)	MF	March 26, 2008 (age 17)	(United States) Atlanta United Academy	2	0
50	Rocket Ritarita	(United States)	FW	April 16, 2007 (age 18)	(United States) Atlanta United Academy	5	0

== Player movement ==
=== In ===
No.	Pos.	Age	Player	Transferred From	Type	Notes	Date	Source
22	GK	25	(Colombia) Sebastián Guerra	(Colombia) Atlético Nacional	Transfer		January 13, 2023	
14	MF	29	(Ghana) Kofi Twumasi	(Germany) VfB Homberg	Transfer		January 13, 2023	
9	FW	29	(France) Karim Tmimi	(United States) Georgia Gwinnett College	Transfer		January 13, 2023	
33	MF	25	(United States) Tyler Young	(United States) Campbell University	Transfer	SuperDraft Pick	March 2, 2023	
7	MF	21	(United States) Luke Brennan	(United States) Atlanta United Academy	Transfer		March 9, 2023	
18	MF	20	(United States) Alan Carleton	(United States) Atlanta United Academy	Transfer		March 15, 2023	
3	DF	31	(England) Fuad Adeniyi	(United States) Tormenta FC	Transfer		March 16, 2023	
39	MF	18	(United States) Adyn Torres	(United States) Atlanta United Academy	Transfer		May 5, 2023	
15	MF	22	(Argentina) Matías Gallardo	(Argentina) River Plate Academy	Transfer		July 27, 2023	
16	DF	25	(United States) Chris Gloster	(United States) New York City	Transfer		July 27, 2023	

=== Out ===
No.	Pos.	Age	Player	Transferred To	Type	Notes	Date	Source
8	MF	23	(Trinidad and Tobago) Ajani Fortune	(United States) Atlanta United FC	Transfer	Homegrown Contract	January 1, 2023	
10	MF	24	(Venezuela) Darwin Matheus	(Croatia) Istra 1961	Transfer	Free	January 1, 2023	
21	FW	26	(United States) Tristan Trager	(United States) Charleston Battery	Out of Contract		January 1, 2023	
39	DF	20	(United States) Noah Cobb	(United States) Atlanta United FC	Transfer	Homegrown Contract	January 1, 2023	
23	GK	22	(Chile) Vicente Reyes	(England) Norwich City	Transfer	Undisclosed	July 1, 2023	
12	DF	23	(Brazil) Raimar	(Portugal) Nacional	Transfer	Undisclosed	July 17, 2023	

== Competitions ==
=== Standings ===
==== Eastern Conference ====
Pos	Div	Team	Pld	W	SOW	SOL	L	GF	GA	GD	Pts
8	NE	New York City FC II	28	12	1	3	12	60	55	+5	41
9	CT	Huntsville City FC	28	9	4	3	12	48	45	+3	38
10	CT	Atlanta United 2	28	9	2	4	13	50	52	−2	35
11	NE	Toronto FC II	28	6	3	5	14	43	57	−14	29
12	CT	FC Cincinnati 2	28	7	2	2	17	37	65	−28	27

Source: MLSNP Eastern Conference
Rules for classification: 1) points; 2) total wins; 3) total goal differential; 4) total goals scored; 5) fewer disciplinary points; 6) away goal differential; 7) away goals scored; 8) home goals differential; 9) home goals scored; 10) coin toss (2 clubs tied) or drawing of lots (≥3 clubs tied)

==== Overall table ====
Pos	Team	Pld	W	SOW	SOL	L	GF	GA	GD	Pts	Awards
17	Huntsville City FC	28	9	4	3	12	48	45	+3	38	
18	North Texas SC	28	9	1	7	11	43	45	−2	36	
19	Atlanta United 2	28	9	2	4	13	50	52	−2	35	
20	Portland Timbers 2	28	11	0	1	16	40	63	−23	34	U.S. Open Cup First Round
21	Whitecaps FC 2	28	8	3	4	13	36	49	−13	34	

Source: MLSNP
Rules for classification: 1) points; 2) total wins; 3) total goal differential; 4) total goals scored; 5) fewer disciplinary points; 6) away goal differential; 7) away goals scored; 8) home goals differential; 9) home goals scored; 10) coin toss (2 clubs tied) or drawing of lots (≥3 clubs tied)

==== Matches ====
March 26 1	Atlanta United 2	2–3	New England Revolution II	Kennesaw, Georgia
7:00 PM EDT	Raimar 82'; Firmino 90' (pen.)	Report	McFadden 37' (o.g.); Rozhansky (yellow card) 45' (goal) 52'; Adebayo-Smith (yellow card) 55'; Awashie (yellow card) 73'; Cayet 60'	Stadium: Fifth Third Bank Stadium; Attendance: 463

April 2 2	Atlanta United 2	1–1 (4–5 p)	New York Red Bulls II	Kennesaw, Georgia
7:00 PM EDT	López 4'; Mejía (yellow card) 70'; Diop (yellow card) 74'	Report	Nocita (yellow card) 24'; Thomas (yellow card) 46'; Salinas (yellow card) 52'; Carmona 57'; Sullivan (yellow card) 80'; Mullings (yellow card) 83'	Stadium: Fifth Third Bank Stadium; Attendance: 541; Referee: Greg Dopka
	Penalties
	López (penalty scored); Firmino (penalty missed); Tmimi (penalty scored); Adeniyi (penalty scored); Tiente (penalty scored)		Ssebuufu (penalty scored); Carmona (penalty scored); Edelman (penalty scored); Salinas (penalty scored); Ruiz (penalty scored)

April 9 3	New York City II	2–0	Atlanta United 2	Queens, New York City
7:00 PM EDT	Haak 8' (yellow card) 21'; Jasson 77'	Report		Stadium: Belson Stadium

April 16 4	Atlanta United 2	3–1	Orlando City B	Kennesaw, Georgia
7:30 PM EDT	López 25' (pen.); Firmino 45+2', 56'; McFadden (yellow card) 58'	Report	Medina (yellow card) 46'; Juninho (yellow card) 76'; Acuña 90+1' (pen.)	Stadium: Fifth Third Bank Stadium; Referee: Anya Voigt

April 22 5	Atlanta United 2	2–0	Chicago Fire II	Kennesaw, Georgia
7:30 PM EDT	Firmino 10', 84' (yellow card) 77'; Fortune (yellow card) 42'; Brennan (yellow card) 45+1'; Centeno (yellow card) 63'	Report	Ostrem (yellow card) 20'; Glasgow (yellow card) 72'	Stadium: Fifth Third Bank Stadium; Referee: Austin Saini

April 30 6	Atlanta United 2	1–0	Philadelphia Union II	Kennesaw, Georgia
6:00 PM EDT	McFadden (yellow card) 31'; Tmimi 40'; Brennan (yellow card) 86'	Report	Riasco (yellow card) 31'; Westfield (yellow card) 45+1'; Villero (yellow card) 55'; Portella (yellow card) 70'	Stadium: Fifth Third Bank Stadium; Referee: Luis Guardia

May 7 7	Inter Miami II	3–2	Atlanta United 2	Fort Lauderdale, Florida
6:30 PM EDT	Reyes (yellow card) 15'; Meek 17'; D'Agostini (yellow card) 24'; McFadden 25' (o.g.); Sar-Sar (yellow card) 79'; Perkovich 88'	Report	Wolff 1'; Tmimi 4'; Raimar (yellow card) 83'	Stadium: DRV PNK Stadium; Referee: Thomas Snyder

May 14 8	Atlanta United 2	1–2	Crown Legacy	Kennesaw, Georgia
5:00 PM EDT	Morales 44'	Report	Mello 4'; Filipović 73'	Stadium: Fifth Third Bank Stadium

May 19 9	Orlando City B	2–2 (4–5 p)	Atlanta United 2	Kissimmee, Florida
7:00 PM EDT	Lynn 52', 68'	Report	Tmimi 6'; Brennan 51' (pen.)	Stadium: Osceola County Stadium; Referee: Elvis Osmanovic
	Penalties
	Lynn (penalty scored); Medina (penalty missed); Rivera (penalty scored); Solis (penalty scored); Taifi (penalty scored); Almaguer (penalty missed)		Raimar (penalty scored); Brennan (penalty missed); Firmino (penalty scored); McFadden (penalty scored); Tiente (penalty scored); Carleton (penalty scored)

May 25 10	FC Cincinnati 2	1–1 (3–2 p)	Atlanta United 2	Highland Heights, Kentucky
7:00 PM EDT	Stitz 73'	Report	Tmimi 2'	Stadium: NKU Soccer Stadium; Referee: DeShun Beard
	Penalties
	Stitz (penalty scored); Halsey (penalty scored); Mills (penalty scored); Marshall (penalty missed)		Firmino (penalty missed); Adeniyi (penalty scored); Mejía (penalty scored); Brennan (penalty missed); Tiente (penalty missed)

May 28 11	Atlanta United 2	2–0	Toronto FC II	Kennesaw, Georgia
6:00 PM EDT	Gavran 29' (o.g.); Tmimi 49'	Report		Stadium: Fifth Third Bank Stadium; Referee: Anya Voigt

June 4 12	Atlanta United 2	5–0	Inter Miami II	Kennesaw, Georgia
7:30 PM EDT	Centeno 16' (yellow card) 57'; Firmino 66', 68'; Mejía 70', 90+3'	Report	Perkovich (yellow card) 22'; Abadia-Reda (yellow card) 28' (yellow-red card) 34'; Sar-Sar (yellow card) 89'	Stadium: Fifth Third Bank Stadium; Referee: Shawn Tehini

June 9 13	Philadelphia Union II	1–0	Atlanta United 2	Chester, Pennsylvania
7:00 PM EDT	Olney 57'	Report		Stadium: Subaru Park; Referee: Laura Rodriguez

June 15 14	Columbus Crew 2	2–2 (6–5 p)	Atlanta United 2	Columbus, Ohio
7:00 PM EDT	Rayo 9'; Adu-Gyamfi 90+3'	Report	Firmino 58'; Conway 76'	Stadium: Historic Crew Stadium; Referee: Gabriele Giusti
	Penalties
	Mohamed (penalty scored); Habroune (penalty scored); Knight (penalty scored); Fuson (penalty scored); Roberts (penalty missed); Holstad (penalty scored); Gannon (penalty scored)		Raimar (penalty missed); Conway (penalty scored); Tmimi (penalty scored); Firmino (penalty scored); Tiente (penalty scored); Twumasi (penalty scored); Morales (penalty missed)

June 18 15	Toronto FC II	0–0 (4–3 p)	Atlanta United 2	Toronto, Ontario
7:00 PM EDT	Curic (penalty scored); Altobelli (penalty scored); Batiz (penalty missed); Antonoglou (penalty scored); Faria (penalty scored)	Report	Conway (penalty scored); Carleton (penalty scored); Tmimi (penalty missed); Villal (penalty missed); Tiente (penalty scored)	Stadium: York Lions Stadium; Referee: Jérémie Blanchette

June 25 16	Atlanta United 2	4–2	New York City II	Kennesaw, Georgia
7:30 PM EDT	Conway 59' (pen.); McFadden 67'; Firmino 74', 84'	Report	Myers 23'; Arévalo 50'	Stadium: Fifth Third Bank Stadium; Referee: Greg Dopka

July 9 17	Crown Legacy	3–1	Atlanta United 2	Matthews, North Carolina
5:00 PM EDT	Agyemang 42', 44'; Guilherme 84'	Report	Brennan 68'	Stadium: Sportsplex at Matthews; Referee: Chris Ruska

July 16 18	Orlando City B	3–2	Atlanta United 2	Kissimmee, Florida
7:00 PM EDT	Cobb 29' (o.g.); Acuña 75'; Rivera 76'	Report	Conway 45' (pen.); Firmino 60'	Stadium: Osceola County Stadium; Referee: Emma Richards

July 23 19	Atlanta United 2	2–4	Huntsville City	Kennesaw, Georgia
7:30 PM EDT	Brennan 7'; Firmino 45'	Report	Bolanos 25'; Liadi 73'; Perry 80'; Amiche 87'	Stadium: Fifth Third Bank Stadium; Referee: Cameron Siler

July 28 20	Atlanta United 2	0–2	Columbus Crew 2	Kennesaw, Georgia
7:30 PM EDT		Report	Habroune 50'; Gannon 60'	Stadium: Fifth Third Bank Stadium; Attendance: 0 Referee: Laura Rodriguez

August 4 21	Chicago Fire II	2–1	Atlanta United 2	Bridgeview, Illinois
7:00 PM EDT	Bezerra 45'; Monis 57'	Report	Gal 90+5' (o.g.)	Stadium: SeatGeek Stadium; Referee: Melvin Rivas

August 9 22	Atlanta United 2	3–1	Crown Legacy	Kennesaw, Georgia
7:30 PM EDT	Cobb 30'; Orji 45'; Firmino 55'	Report	Tavares 19'	Stadium: Fifth Third Bank Stadium

August 13 23	New England Revolution II	5–1	Atlanta United 2	Foxborough, Massachusetts
7:00 PM EDT	Rivera 8'; Adebayo-Smith 67', 90'; Bajraktarevic 80'; Okello 90+4'	Report	Conway 19'	Stadium: Gillette Stadium; Referee: Adam Mitchell

August 21 24	New York Red Bulls II	4–2	Atlanta United 2	Montclair, New Jersey
7:00 PM EDT	Kasule 20', 60'; Ssebuufu 28'; Carmona 39'	Report	Firmino 18'; Brennan 78'	Stadium: MSU Soccer Park; Referee: Stephen Foster

September 2 25	Atlanta United 2	3–1	FC Cincinnati 2	Kennesaw, Georgia
5:00 PM EDT	Tmimi 15'; Fortune 30'; Firmino 81'	Report	Stitz 57'	Stadium: Fifth Third Bank Stadium; Referee: Laura Rodriguez

September 10 26	Huntsville City	1–2	Atlanta United 2	Huntsville, Alabama
7:00 PM EDT	Skinner 45+1'	Report	Chol 49'; Conway 90+6'	Stadium: Joe W. Davis Stadium; Attendance: 4,604; Referee: Greg Dopka

September 17 27	Atlanta United 2	3–3 (5–3 p)	Inter Miami II	Kennesaw, Georgia
7:30 PM EDT	Cobb 42'; Firmino 68'; Twumasi 81'	Report	Sunderland 3', 44'; Hall 35'	Stadium: Fifth Third Bank Stadium; Referee: Shawn Tehini
	Penalties
	Firmino (penalty scored); Tmimi (penalty scored); Etienne (penalty scored); Gallardo (penalty scored); Adeniyi (penalty scored)		Johnson (penalty missed); Sunderland (penalty scored); Sessock (penalty scored); Sar-Sar (penalty scored)

September 24 28	Columbus Crew 2	3–2	Atlanta United 2	Columbus, Ohio
2:00 PM EDT	Micaletto 2'; Mohamed 19'; Rayo 31' (pen.)	Report	Cobb 37'; Mejía 82'	Stadium: Historic Crew Stadium; Referee: Drew Klemp

== Statistics ==
=== Top Scorers ===
As of September 30, 2023

Place	Position	Name	MLS Next Pro	Playoffs	Total
1	MF	(Brazil) Nicolas Firmino	16	0	16
2	FW	(France) Karim Tmimi	6	0	6
3	FW	(United States) Jackson Conway	5	0	5
4	MF	(United States) Luke Brennan	4	0	4
5	DF	(United States) Noah Cobb	3	0	3
5	MF	(Peru) David Mejía	3	0	3
7	FW	(Paraguay) Erik López	2	0	2
8	MF	(United States) Erik Centeno	1	0	1
8	MF	(South Sudan) Machop Chol	1	0	1
8	MF	(Trinidad and Tobago) Ajani Fortune	1	0	1
8	DF	(United States) Aiden McFadden	1	0	1
8	DF	(Bolivia) Efrain Morales	1	0	1
8	DF	(Nigeria) Nelson Orji	1	0	1
8	DF	(Brazil) Raimar	1	0	1
8	MF	(Ghana) Kofi Twumasi	1	0	1
8	MF	(United States) Tyler Wolff	1	0	1
Own Goals			2	0	2
Total			50	0	50
