= 2024 Atlanta United 2 season =

Atlanta United 2
2024 season
- Owner: Arthur Blank
- President: Garth Lagerwey
- Head coach: Steve Cooke
- Stadium: Fifth Third Bank Stadium
Home colors	Away colors
- All statistics correct as of January 3, 2025.

The 2024 Atlanta United 2 season was the team's seventh year of existence as well as their second season in MLS Next Pro, the third tier of the American soccer pyramid.

== Club ==
Squad no.	Name	Nationality	Position(s)	Date of birth (age)	Previous club	Apps	Goals
Contracted Players
36	Ramzi Qawasmy	(United States)	DF	November 30, 1999 (age 26)	(United States) Louisville City	18	0
38	Ethan Dudley	(United States)	DF	April 11, 2000 (age 25)	(United States) Union Omaha	13	1
41	Alan Carleton	(United States)	MF	March 20, 2005 (age 20)	(United States) Atlanta United Academy	56	3
42	Jayden Hibbert	(Jamaica)	GK	August 5, 2004 (age 21)	(United States) UConn	19	0
43	Rodrigo Neri	(United States)	FW	May 12, 2005 (age 20)	(Spain) Valencia Academy	12	3
45	Noble Okello	(Canada)	MF	July 20, 2000 (age 25)	(United States) New England Revolution II	26	3
48	Cooper Sanchez	(United States)	MF	March 26, 2008 (age 17)	(United States) Atlanta United Academy	9	0
55	Matías Gallardo	(Argentina)	MF	November 24, 2003 (age 22)	(Argentina) River Plate Academy	31	1
62	Ashton Gordon	(Jamaica)	FW	April 14, 2007 (age 18)	(United States) Atlanta United Academy	16	2
75	Jacob Williams	(United States)	DF	November 8, 1999 (age 26)	(United States) Crown Legacy	17	0
86	Javier Armas	(Spain)	MF	January 13, 2000 (age 26)	(United States) Oregon State University	28	7
88	John Berner	(United States)	GK	February 14, 1991 (age 35)	(United States) Huntsville City	4	0
95	Kaiden Moore	(United States)	DF	May 11, 2007 (age 18)	(United States) Atlanta United Academy	17	1
96	Daniel Russo	(United States)	DF	March 24, 2002 (age 23)	(United States) Notre Dame	2	0
99	Karim Tmimi	(France)	FW	August 8, 1996 (age 29)	(United States) Georgia Gwinnett College	52	15
Players Loaned From Atlanta United
2	Ronald Hernández	(Venezuela)	DF	September 21, 1997 (age 28)	(Scotland) Aberdeen	5	0
14	Aiden McFadden (Note: transferred to Louisville City during the season)	(United States)	DF	September 28, 1998 (age 27)	(United States) Notre Dame	55	9
18	Pedro Amador	(Portugal)	DF	December 18, 1998 (age 27)	(Portugal) Moreirense	1	0
20	Edwin Mosquera	(Colombia)	MF	June 27, 2001 (age 24)	(United States) Independiente Medellín	1	0
21	Efrain Morales	(Bolivia)	DF	March 4, 2004 (age 22)	(United States) Atlanta United Academy	69	3
22	Josh Cohen	(United States)	GK	August 18, 1992 (age 33)	(Israel) Maccabi Haifa	3	0
23	Adyn Torres	(United States)	MF	November 13, 2007 (age 18)	(United States) Atlanta United Academy	31	0
24	Noah Cobb	(United States)	DF	July 20, 2005 (age 20)	(United States) Atlanta United Academy	57	3
25	Luke Brennan	(United States)	MF	February 24, 2005 (age 21)	(United States) Atlanta United Academy	65	10
28	Tyler Wolff	(United States)	MF	February 13, 2003 (age 23)	(United States) Atlanta United Academy	20	7
30	Nicolas Firmino	(Brazil)	MF	January 30, 2001 (age 25)	(United States) Union Omaha	81	22
47	Matthew Edwards	(United States)	DF	February 16, 2003 (age 23)	(United States) University of North Carolina	24	0
52	Erik Centeno	(United States)	MF	June 29, 2002 (age 23)	(United States) University of the Pacific	76	1
—	Derrick Etienne (Note: transferred to Toronto FC during the season)	(Haiti)	MF	November 25, 1996 (age 29)	(United States) Columbus Crew	3	0
Academy Call-Ups
44	Shawn Lanza	(United States)	FW	March 19, 2006 (age 19)	(United States) Atlanta United Academy	16	0
49	Matthew Dejianne	(United States)	FW	November 22, 2006 (age 19)	(United States) Atlanta United Academy	13	0
50	Dominik Chong Qui	(United States)	DF	December 29, 2007 (age 18)	(United States) Atlanta United Academy	17	2
51	Jonathan Ransom	(United States)	GK	January 8, 2008 (age 18)	(United States) Atlanta United Academy	2	0
57	Stephen Hurlock	(United States)	FW	September 28, 2006 (age 19)	(United States) Atlanta United Academy	12	0
64	Miles Hadley	(United States)	DF	May 11, 2006 (age 19)	(United States) Atlanta United Academy	4	1
77	Pavel Romero	(United States)	MF	February 10, 2006 (age 20)	(United States) Atlanta United Academy	1	0
94	Landon Zuniga	(United States)	MF	September 26, 2007 (age 18)	(United States) Atlanta United Academy	1	0

== Player movement ==
=== In ===
No.	Pos.	Age	Player	Transferred From	Type	Notes	Date	Source
75	DF	26	(United States) Jacob Williams	(United States) Crown Legacy	Transfer	Free	January 1, 2024	
45	MF	25	(Canada) Noble Okello	(United States) New England Revolution II	Transfer	Free	January 1, 2024	
88	GK	35	(United States) John Berner	(United States) Huntsville City	Transfer	Free	January 1, 2024	
47	DF	23	(United States) Matthew Edwards	(United States) North Carolina	Transfer		January 1, 2024	
96	DF	23	(United States) Daniel Russo	(United States) Notre Dame	Transfer		January 1, 2024	
42	GK	21	(Jamaica) Jayden Hibbert	(United States) UConn	Transfer	SuperDraft Pick	January 12, 2024	
86	MF	26	(Spain) Javier Armas	(United States) Oregon State	Transfer	SuperDraft Pick	January 18, 2024	
62	FW	18	(Jamaica) Ashton Gordon	(United States) Atlanta United Academy	Transfer	Free	January 29, 2024	
36	DF	26	(United States) Ramzi Qawasmy	(United States) Louisville City	Transfer	Free	April 19, 2024	
38	DF	25	(United States) Ethan Dudley	(United States) Union Omaha	Transfer	Free	May 16, 2024	
48	MF	17	(United States) Cooper Sanchez	(United States) Atlanta United Academy	Transfer	Free	July 2, 2024	
43	FW	20	(United States) Rodrigo Neri	(Spain) Valencia Academy	Transfer	Free	July 11, 2024	
95	DF	18	(United States) Kaiden Moore	(United States) Atlanta United Academy	Transfer	Free	July 26, 2024	

=== Out ===
No.	Pos.	Age	Player	Transferred To	Type	Notes	Date	Source
3	DF	31	(England) Fuad Adeniyi	Free Agent	Option Declined		January 1, 2024	
5	MF	28	(Cameroon) Toni Tiente	Free Agent	Out of Contract		January 1, 2024	
6	DF	23	(Nigeria) Nelson Orji	Free Agent	Out of Contract		January 1, 2024	
7	MF	21	(United States) Luke Brennan	(United States) Atlanta United	Transfer	Homegrown Contract	January 1, 2024	
8	MF	25	(Brazil) Nicolas Firmino	(United States) Atlanta United	Transfer	Free	January 1, 2024	
10	MF	25	(Mexico) Jonantan Villal	(Mexico) Atlético San Luis	Transfer	Undisclosed	January 1, 2024	
11	MF	22	(Peru) David Mejía	(United States) Miami FC	Option Declined		January 1, 2024	
14	MF	29	(Ghana) Kofi Twumasi	(United States) Rhode Island	Out of Contract		January 1, 2024	
16	DF	25	(United States) Chris Gloster	(United States) New Mexico United	Out of Contract		January 1, 2024	
22	GK	25	(Colombia) Sebastián Guerra	(Colombia) Atlético Huila	Out of Contract		January 1, 2024	
33	DF	25	(United States) Tyler Young	Free Agent	Out of Contract		January 1, 2024	
34	MF	22	(Nigeria) Emenike Nwogu	Free Agent	Out of Contract		January 1, 2024	
39	MF	18	(United States) Adyn Torres	(United States) Atlanta United	Transfer	Homegrown Contract	January 1, 2024	
47	DF	23	(United States) Matthew Edwards	(United States) Atlanta United	Transfer	Homegrown Contract	June 21, 2024	

==== Loan out ====
No.	Pos.	Player	Loaned to	Start	End	Source
42	GK	(Jamaica) Jayden Hibbert	(United States) Birmingham Legion	June 17, 2024	July 10, 2024	

== Competitions ==
=== Standings ===
==== Eastern Conference ====
Pos	Div	Team	Pld	W	SOW	SOL	L	GF	GA	GD	Pts
11	NE	New York Red Bulls II	28	10	4	2	12	56	61	−5	40
12	NE	Toronto FC II	28	10	1	5	12	44	51	−7	37
13	SE	Atlanta United 2	28	7	4	3	14	42	64	−22	32
14	SE	Huntsville City FC	28	8	0	5	15	39	53	−14	29
15	NE	New England Revolution II	28	4	4	2	18	37	59	−22	22

Source: MLSNP Eastern Conference
Rules for classification: 1) points; 2) total wins; 3) total goal differential; 4) total goals scored; 5) fewer disciplinary points; 6) away goal differential; 7) away goals scored; 8) home goals differential; 9) home goals scored; 10) coin toss (2 clubs tied) or drawing of lots (≥3 clubs tied)

==== Overall table ====
Pos	Team	Pld	W	SOW	SOL	L	GF	GA	GD	Pts
24	Austin FC II	28	7	4	7	10	44	49	−5	36
25	Minnesota United FC 2	28	8	4	0	16	43	73	−30	32
26	Atlanta United 2	28	7	4	3	14	42	64	−22	32
27	Huntsville City FC	28	8	0	5	15	39	53	−14	29
28	Colorado Rapids 2	28	6	1	3	18	37	54	−17	23

Source: MLSNP
Rules for classification: 1) points; 2) total wins; 3) total goal differential; 4) total goals scored; 5) fewer disciplinary points; 6) away goal differential; 7) away goals scored; 8) home goals differential; 9) home goals scored; 10) coin toss (2 clubs tied) or drawing of lots (≥3 clubs tied)

==== Matches ====
March 16 1	Atlanta United 2	2–3	Orlando City B	Kennesaw, Georgia
3:00 PM EDT	Armas 11' (pen.); Morales 90+1'	Report	Solís 27' (pen.); Tsukada 30'; Guske 49'	Stadium: Fifth Third Bank Stadium; Attendance: Alex Beehler

March 24 2	Atlanta United 2	4–0	Carolina Core	Kennesaw, Georgia
3:00 PM ET	Armas (yellow card) 2' (goal) 34'; Brennan 24', 26'; Ayo (yellow card) 40'; Tmimi 79'	Report	Diaz (yellow card) 51'; Canete (yellow card) 59'	Stadium: Fifth Third Stadium; Attendance: 550; Referee: Elvis Osmanovic

April 14 3	Atlanta United 2	0–5	Philadelphia Union II	Kennesaw, Georgia
3:00 PM ET		Report	Donovan 18', 65'; Davis 49'; Olney 54'; Tucker 81'	Stadium: Fifth Third Stadium; Referee: Shawn Tehini

April 21 4	Atlanta United 2	1–4	FC Cincinnati 2	Kennesaw, Georgia
3:00 PM ET	Tmimi 42'	Report	Tablante 16'; Mangione 33'; Benalcazar 55'; Stitz 67'	Stadium: Fifth Third Stadium; Referee: Katherine McCormick

April 24 5	Atlanta United 2	1–0	Chattanooga FC	Kennesaw, Georgia
7:30 PM ET	Armas 20' (pen.); Gallardo (yellow card) 31'; Torres (yellow card) 76'		Prepeliță (yellow card) 7'; Rivas (yellow card) 45'; Jiménez (yellow card) 58'	Stadium: Fifth Third Stadium

April 24 6	Chicago Fire II	2–0	Atlanta United 2	Bridgeview, Illinois
2:00 PM ET	Osorio 39' (pen.); Glasgow 90+3'	Report		Stadium: SeatGeek Stadium

May 3 7	Atlanta United 2	0–0 (4–2 p)	New York City II	Kennesaw, Georgia
7:30 PM ET				Stadium: Fifth Third Stadium
	Penalties
	Armas (penalty scored); Okello (penalty scored); Carleton (penalty scored); Williams (penalty missed); Tmimi (penalty scored)		Calheira (penalty scored); Jiménez (penalty missed); Tiao (penalty missed); Rozhansky (penalty scored)

May 8 8	Atlanta United 2	1–2	Carolina Core	Kennesaw, Georgia
7:30 PM ET	Okello 31'	Report	Evans 43'; Diaz 45+2'	Stadium: Fifth Third Stadium; Referee: Alejo Calume

May 18 9	Huntsville City	2–3	Atlanta United 2	Huntsville, Alabama
8:00 PM ET	Ajago 67', 90'	Report	Armas 30'; Hadley 53'; Tmimi 88'	Stadium: Joe W. Davis Stadium; Attendance: 4,807; Referee: Aleksandar Zhelyazkov

May 25 10	Chattanooga FC	2–2 (5–3 p)	Atlanta United 2	Chattanooga, Tennessee
7:00 PM ET	Garvanian 47'; Ibarra 87'	Report	Brennan 9'; Armas 90+4' (pen.)	Stadium: Finley Stadium; Attendance: 4,115; Referee: Esad Omanovic
	Penalties
	Garvanian (penalty scored); Sar-Sar (penalty scored); Prepeliță (penalty scored); Ibarra (penalty scored); Rivas (penalty scored)		Armas (penalty scored); Gallardo (penalty scored); Okello (penalty scored); Williams (penalty missed)

May 31 11	Atlanta United 2	0–1	Crown Legacy	Kennesaw, Georgia
7:30 PM ET			John 90+1'	Stadium: Fifth Third Stadium; Referee: Thomas Snyder

June 26 12	Orlando City B	2–2 (5–3 p)	Atlanta United 2	Kissimmee, Florida
7:00 PM ET	Rivera 11'; Loyola 90+5'	Report	Firmino 70'; Tmimi 88'	Stadium: Osceola County Stadium; Referee: Alejo Calume
	Penalties
	Solís (penalty scored); Rivera (penalty scored); Guske (penalty scored); Loyola (penalty scored); Mohammed (penalty scored)		Armas (penalty scored); Okello (penalty scored); Carleton (penalty missed); Firmino (penalty scored)

June 30 13	Inter Miami II	4–1	Atlanta United 2	Fort Lauderdale, Florida
6:00 PM ET	Morales 4'; Reyes 69' (pen.); Edwards 83' (o.g.); Zeltzer-Zubida 90+1'	Report	Tmimi 75'	Stadium: Chase Stadium; Referee: John Matto

July 7 14	New York Red Bulls II	6–2	Atlanta United 2	Montclair, New Jersey
5:00 PM ET	Rosborough 15'; Williams 43' (o.g.); Hall 45', 90+6'; Gutierrez 45+6'; Mosquera 88'	Report	Tmimi 27'; Chong Qui 90+5'	Stadium: MSU Soccer Park; Referee: Marie Durr

July 14 15	Atlanta United 2	2–2 (4–3 p)	Columbus Crew 2	Kennesaw, Georgia
7:30 PM ET	Gallardo 79'; Chong Qui 84'	Report	Da 14'; Pearson 88'	Stadium: Fifth Third Stadium; Referee: Emma Richards
	Penalties
	Armas (penalty scored); Okello (penalty scored); Gallardo (penalty missed); Qawasmy (penalty scored); Tmimi (penalty scored)		Pearson (penalty missed); Adu-Gyamfi (penalty missed); Rayo (penalty scored); Brown (penalty scored); Presthus (penalty scored)

July 21 16	Crown Legacy	2–1	Atlanta United 2	Matthews, North Carolina
5:00 PM ET	Sing 22'; Cambridge 67' (pen.)	Report	Firmino 74'	Stadium: Sportsplex at Matthews; Referee: Velimir Stefanovic

July 27 17	Huntsville City	1–2	Atlanta United 2	Huntsville, Alabama
8:00 PM ET	Wright 75' (pen.)	Report	Neri 47', 50'	Stadium: Joe W. Davis Stadium; Attendance: 4,874; Referee: Muhammad Hassan

August 3 18	Atlanta United 2	3–2	New England Revolution II	Kennesaw, Georgia
8:30 PM ET	Tmimi 13'; Carleton 36', 38'	Report	Butts 48'; Monis 69'	Stadium: Fifth Third Stadium; Referee: Alejo Calume

August 11 19	Atlanta United 2	2–1	Toronto FC II	Kennesaw, Georgia
7:30 PM ET	Moore 27'; Neri 48'	Report	Altobelli 16'	Stadium: Fifth Third Stadium; Referee: Adam Mitchell

August 18 20	Inter Miami II	1–1 (3–4 p)	Atlanta United 2	Fort Lauderdale, Florida
6:00 PM ET	Fray 63'	Report	Armas 54'	Stadium: Chase Stadium; Referee: DeShun Beard
	Penalties
	Reyes (penalty scored); Afonso (penalty missed); Negri (penalty scored); Carmichael (penalty scored); Sunderland (penalty missed)		Armas (penalty scored); Okello (penalty scored); Carleton (penalty scored); Williams (penalty missed); Qawasmy (penalty scored)

August 23 21	Atlanta United 2	1–4	Orlando City B	Kennesaw, Georgia
7:30 PM ET	Okello 69'	Report	Tsukada 15'; Almaguer 38'; Petrasso 43'; Mohammed 57'	Stadium: Fifth Third Stadium; Referee: Melinda Homa

August 28 22	Carolina Core	4–1	Atlanta United 2	High Point, North Carolina
7:30 PM ET	Canate 2', 57'; Polanco 57'; Evans 90'	Report	Dudley 38'	Stadium: Truist Point; Attendance: 2,522; Referee: Danielle Chesky

September 1 23	Chattanooga FC	3–4	Atlanta United 2	Chattanooga, Tennessee
7:00 PM ET	Garvanian 27'; Ouamri 45+1', 62'	Report	Carleton 12'; Armas 48' (pen.); Gordon 87'; Tmimi 90+9'	Stadium: Finley Stadium; Attendance: 3,554; Referee: William Hale

September 6 24	New York City II	2–2 (2–4 p)	Atlanta United 2	Manhattan, New York
5:00 PM ET	Arévalo 23'; Ruiz 67'	Report	Brennan 18'; Hope-Gund 90+4' (o.g.)	Stadium: Icahn Stadium; Referee: Stephanie MacFarland
	Penalties
	Rozhansky (penalty scored); Calheira (penalty missed); Owusu (penalty scored); Barraza (penalty missed)		Armas (penalty scored); Carleton (penalty scored); Gallardo (penalty scored); Firmino (penalty scored)

September 15 25	Atlanta United 2	3–6	Huntsville City	Kennesaw, Georgia
3:00 PM ET	Okello 44'; Tmimi 49'; Gordon 81'	Report	Pacius 12', 37', 88' (pen.); Ajango 22'; Bolanos 35'; Pérez 85'	Stadium: Fifth Third Stadium; Referee: Promise Adebayo-Ige

September 19 26	Crown Legacy	0–0 (5–3 p)	Atlanta United 2	Matthews, North Carolina
7:30 PM ET		Report		Stadium: Sportsplex at Matthews; Referee: Muhammad Hassan
	Penalties
	Nyandjo (penalty scored); Mirkovic (penalty scored); Berchimas (penalty scored); Scardina (penalty scored); Bravo (penalty scored)		Armas (penalty scored); Okello (penalty scored); Carleton (penalty missed); Tmimi (penalty scored)

September 15 27	Atlanta United 2	0–1	Inter Miami II	Kennesaw, Georgia
7:30 PM ET		Report	Carmichael 32'	Stadium: Fifth Third Stadium; Referee: Katherine McCormick

September 29 28	Philadelphia Union II	2–1	Atlanta United 2	Chester, Pennsylvania
3:00 PM ET	Sullivan 78'; Olney 90+5'	Report	Firmino 43' (pen.)	Stadium: Subaru Park; Referee: Marie Durr

== Statistics ==
=== Top Scorers ===
As of September 30, 2024

Place	Position	Name	MLS Next Pro	Playoffs	Total
1	FW	(France) Karim Tmimi	9	0	9
2	MF	(Spain) Javier Armas	7	0	7
3	MF	(United States) Luke Brennan	4	0	4
4	MF	(United States) Alan Carleton	3	0	3
4	MF	(Brazil) Nicolas Firmino	3	0	3
4	FW	(United States) Rodrigo Neri	3	0	3
4	MF	(Canada) Noble Okello	3	0	3
8	DF	(United States) Dominik Chong Qui	2	0	2
8	MF	(Jamaica) Ashton Gordon	2	0	2
10	DF	(United States) Ethan Dudley	1	0	1
10	MF	(Argentina) Matías Gallardo	1	0	1
10	DF	(United States) Miles Hadley	1	0	1
10	DF	(United States) Kaiden Moore	1	0	1
10	DF	(Bolivia) Efrain Morales	1	0	1
Own Goals			1	0	1
Total			42	0	42
