= 2026 Atlanta United 2 season =

Atlanta United 2
2026 season
- Owner: Arthur Blank
- Head coach: Jose Silva Caparros
- Stadium: Fifth Third Bank Stadium
- MLS Next Pro: 3rd Eastern
- MLS Next Pro Playoffs: Conference Quarterfinals
Home colors	Away colors
- All statistics correct as of October 17, 2026.

The 2026 Atlanta United 2 season will be the team's ninth year of existence as well as their fourth season in MLS Next Pro, the third tier of the American soccer pyramid. Before the season on December 15, 2025, it was announced that Jose Silva Carrapos was named the head coach following a promising interim stint for the second half of the previous season.

== Club ==
Squad no.	Name	Nationality	Position(s)	Date of birth (age)	Previous club	Apps	Goals
Contracted Players
31	Caio	(Brazil)	FW	March 6, 2008 (age 18)	(Brazil) FC América U20	1	0
33	Patrick Weah	(Liberia)	FW	December 15, 2003 (age 22)	(United States) Minnesota United	37	11
38	Liam Butts (Note: Loaned to Loudoun United on September 10.)	(Guyana)	FW	February 20, 2001 (age 25)	(United States) New England Revolution II	17	4
39	Arif Kovac	(United States)	FW	September 8, 2006 (age 20)	Academy	30	20
41	Toto Majub	(Uganda)	DF	December 19, 2005 (age 20)	(Uganda) Amusi Football Club	26	1
44	Daniel Chica	(United States)	FW	February 18, 2002 (age 24)	(United States) Carolina Core	26	4
51	Jonathan Ransom	(Canada)	GK	January 8, 2008 (age 18)	Academy	33	0
56	Ignacio Suarez	(United States)	MF	April 3, 2009 (age 17)	Academy	30	3
60	James Donaldson	(United States)	GK	March 20, 2009 (age 17)	Academy	7	0
64	Mohamed Cisset	(Mali)	DF	August 25, 2004 (age 22)	(United States) North Texas SC	25	0
67	Enzo Dovlo	(Togo)	MF	July 23, 2003 (age 23)	(United States) UNCG	27	5
70	Cameron Dunbar	(United States)	MF	October 22, 2002 (age 23)	(United States) Orange County SC	29	9
78	Andrew Jardines	(United States)	MF	September 4, 2007 (age 19)	Academy	20	1
80	Moisés Tablante (Note: Transferred to Lusitânia on July 23.)	(Venezuela)	MF	July 4, 2001 (age 25)	(United States) FC Cincinnati 2	42	5
81	David Sibrian	(El Salvador)	MF	November 5, 2009 (age 16)	Academy	30	0
82	Matthew Senanou	(United States)	DF	March 21, 2003 (age 23)	(United States) Colorado Rapids 2	28	1
Players Loaned From Atlanta United
16	Adrian Gill	(United States)	MF	January 3, 2006 (age 20)	(Spain) Barcelona B	17	1
20	Luke Brennan	(United States)	MF	February 24, 2005 (age 21)	Academy	74	13
28	Will Reilly	(United States)	MF	December 3, 2002 (age 23)	(United States) Stanford	42	0
30	Cayman Togashi	(Japan)	FW	August 10, 1993 (age 33)	(Japan) Sagan Tosu	9	4
35	Jay Fortune	(Trinidad and Tobago)	MF	December 30, 2002 (age 23)	Academy	70	4
40	Santiago Pita	(Venezuela)	MF	June 1, 2007 (age 19)	Academy	30	3
42	Jayden Hibbert	(Canada)	GK	August 5, 2004 (age 22)	(United States) UConn	34	0
47	Matthew Edwards	(United States)	DF	September 17, 2003 (age 23)	(United States) UNC	25	0
50	Dominik Chong-Qui	(United States)	DF	December 29, 2007 (age 18)	Academy	62	5
Academy Call-Ups
52	Seyi Fakiseyi	(United States)	DF	January 6, 2010 (age 16)	Academy	12	0
61	Adedamola Browne	(United States)	MF	June 15, 2009 (age 17)	Academy	5	0
76	Noe Santillan	(United States)	MF	March 8, 2010 (age 16)	Academy	2	0
72	Ilan Ettinger	(United States)	DF	June 6, 2008 (age 18)	Academy	8	0
79	David Ilevbare	(United States)	MF	August 6, 2010 (age 16)	Academy	2	0
83	Joshua Kwon	(United States)	MF	January 14, 2010 (age 16)	Academy	6	0
85	Amir Henry	(United States)	FW	January 25, 2009 (age 17)	Academy	6	0
95	Gonzalo Riveras	(Venezuela)	MF	March 25, 2010 (age 16)	Academy	3	0

== Player movement ==
=== In ===
No.	Pos.	Age	Player	Transferred from	Type	Notes	Date	Source
38	FW	25	(Guyana) Liam Butts	(United States) New England Revolution II	Transfer	Free	December 17, 2025	
44	DF	24	(United States) Daniel Chica	(United States) Carolina Core	Transfer	Free	December 17, 2025	
70	MF	23	(United States) Cameron Dunbar	(United States) Orange County SC	Transfer	Free	December 17, 2025	
64	DF	22	(Mali) Mohamed Cisset	(United States) North Texas SC	Transfer	Free	January 28, 2026	
82	DF	23	(United States) Matthew Senanou	(United States) Colorado Rapids 2	Transfer	Free	January 28, 2026	
81	MF	16	(El Salvador) David Sibrian	Academy	Transfer	Free	February 24, 2026	
67	MF	23	(Togo) Enzo Dovlo	(United States) UNCG	Transfer	SuperDraft Pick	February 27, 2026	
78	MF	19	(United States) Andrew Jardines	Academy	Transfer	Free	August 17, 2026	
31	FW	18	(Brazil) Caio	(Brazil) FC América U20	Transfer	Free	August 19, 2026	

=== Out ===
No.	Pos.	Player	Transferred To	Type	Notes	Date	Source
36	FW	(Northern Ireland) Ryan Carmichael	(United States) Forward Madison	Option Declined		November 18, 2025	
38	DF	(New Zealand) Ronan Wynne	(New Zealand) Auckland FC	Option Declined		November 18, 2025	
55	DF	(Canada) Salvatore Mazzaferro	(United States) Loudoun United	Option Declined		November 18, 2025	
77	FW	(United States) Rodrigo Neri	(United States) University of Maryland	Option Declined		November 18, 2025	
86	MF	(Spain) Javier Armas	(United States) Fort Wayne FC	Out of Contract		November 18, 2025	
95	DF	(United States) Kaiden Moore	(United States) Atlanta United	Transfer	Homegrown Contract	January 1, 2026	
40	MF	(Venezuela) Santiago Pita	(United States) Atlanta United	Transfer	Homegrown Contract	January 1, 2026	
80	MF	(Venezuela) Moisés Tablante	(Portugal) Lusitânia	Transfer	Undisclosed Fee	July 23, 2026	

==== Loan out ====
No.	Pos.	Player	Loaned to	Start	End	Source
38	FW	(Guyana) Liam Butts	(United States) Loudoun United	September 10, 2026	End of season	

=== Academy Departures ===
Denotes departed players from the Academy who have made at least one appearance for Atlanta United 2.

No.	Pos.	Age	Player	College/Club
61	DF	19	(United States) Braden Dunham	Furman
71	DF	19	(United States) Seamus Streelman	Clemson
73	DF	19	(United States) Ayo Akintobi	Portland

== Competitions ==
=== Standings ===
==== Eastern Conference ====
Pos	Div	Team	Pld	W	SOW	SOL	L	GF	GA	GD	Pts	Qualification
1	SE	Crown Legacy FC	28	15	5	3	5	67	39	+28	58	Round one
2	SE	Chattanooga FC	28	15	4	3	6	56	39	+17	56	Round one
3	SE	Atlanta United 2	28	14	1	4	9	62	46	+16	48	Round one
4	NE	Columbus Crew 2	28	12	5	2	9	49	43	+6	48	Round one
5	NE	New England Revolution II	28	12	4	4	8	47	42	+5	48	Round one

Source: MLSNP
Rules for classification: 1) Points; 2) Total regulation wins; 3) Total goal differential; 4) Total goals scored; 5) Total shootout wins; 6) Away goal differential; 7) Away goals scored; 8) Home goals differential; 9) Home goals scored; 10) Fewer disciplinary points; 11) Drawing of lots.

==== Overall table ====
Pos	Div	Team	Pld	W	SOW	SOL	L	GF	GA	GD	Pts
5	PC	Ventura County FC	28	14	4	3	7	58	36	+22	53
6	FR	Houston Dynamo 2	28	14	4	2	8	53	33	+20	52
7	SE	Atlanta United 2	28	14	1	4	9	62	46	+16	48
8	NE	Columbus Crew 2	28	12	5	2	9	49	43	+6	48
9	NE	New England Revolution II	28	12	4	4	8	47	42	+5	48

Source: MLSNP
Rules for classification: 1) Points; 2) Total regulation wins; 3) Total goal differential; 4) Total goals scored; 5) Total shootout wins; 6) Away goal differential; 7) Away goals scored; 8) Home goals differential; 9) Home goals scored; 10) Fewer disciplinary points; 11) Drawing of lots.

==== Results summary ====
Round	1	2	3	4	5	6	7	8	9	10	11	12	13	14	15	16	17	18	19	20	21	22	23	24	25	26	27	28
Stadium	A	H	H	A	A	A	A	A	H	A	A	H	H	A	H	H	H	A	H	H	A	H	H	H	A	H	A	A
Result	D	W	W	L	L	W	W	W	L	W	L	W	D	L	D	W	W	L	W	D	L	L	W	W	D	W	L	W
Position (East)	8	4	3	7	8	6	5	3	6	5	6	4	7	7	8	7	7	7	6	6	6	8	6	6	6	3	5	3

A = Away; H = Home; W = Win; D = Draw; L = Loss; P = Postponed

==== Matches ====
March 1 1	New England Revolution II	1–1 (4–2 p)	Atlanta United 2	Smithfield, Rhode Island
8:00 PM EDT	Morgan 70'		Mimy 24' (o.g.)	Stadium: Beirne Stadium
	Penalties
	Da (penalty scored); Klein (penalty scored); Mussenden (penalty scored); Zambrano (penalty scored)		(penalty scored) Dunbar; (penalty scored) Kovač; (penalty missed) Fakiseyi; (penalty missed) Tablante

March 8 2	Atlanta United 2	2–1	Carolina Core	Athens, Georgia
7:00 PM EDT	Togashi 32'; Chica 62'	Report	Senanou 46' (o.g.)	Stadium: Turner Soccer Complex; Referee: Luis Diego Arroyo

March 15 3	Atlanta United 2	4–1	Huntsville City	Athens, Georgia
7:00 PM EDT	Butts 26', 62'; Brennan 57'; Dovlo 86'	Report	Christiano 14'	Stadium: Turner Soccer Complex; Referee: Corbyn May

March 22 4	Crown Legacy	3–0	Atlanta United 2	Matthews, North Carolina
7:00 PM EDT	Berchimas 61'; Aloko 84'; Smalls 90'	Report		Stadium: Sportsplex at Matthews; Referee: Benjamin Meyer

April 3 5	Crown Legacy	2–0	Atlanta United 2	Matthews, North Carolina
7:00 PM EDT	Mbongue 1'; Kessler 50'	Report		Stadium: Sportsplex at Matthews; Referee: Yannick Rothfuss

April 10 6	Inter Miami II	0–2	Atlanta United 2	Fort Lauderdale, Florida
7:00 PM EDT		Report	Kovac 15'; Dunbar 53'	Stadium: Chase Stadium; Referee: Elton Garcia

April 18 7	Chicago Fire II	0–3	Atlanta United 2	Bridgeview, Illinois
4:00 PM EDT		Report	Kovac 4'; Dunbar 35'; Gill 84'	Stadium: SeatGeek Stadium

May 2 8	Carolina Core FC	1–2	Atlanta United 2	High Point, North Carolina
6:00 PM EDT	Sumo 57'	Report	Dunbar 29', 45+2'	Stadium: Truist Point Stadium

May 10 9	Atlanta United 2	0–2	Orlando City B	Athens, Georgia
7:00 PM EDT		Report	Caraballo 9' (pen.); Haruna 75'	Stadium: Turner Soccer Complex

May 16 10	Huntsville City	2–6	Atlanta United 2	Huntsville, Alabama
8:00 PM EDT	Christiano 18'; Gaines 45+3'	Report	Kovac 53', 66', 75', 90+5', 90+8'; Butts 90+3'	Stadium: Joe W. Davis Stadium; Referee: Corbin Goodyear

May 23 11	Philadelphia Union II	2–1	Atlanta United 2	Chester, Pennsylvania
3:00 PM EDT	De Paula 48'; Reed 83'	Report	Kovac 5'	Stadium: WSFS Bank Sportsplex; Referee: Jorge Escobar

June 6 12	Atlanta United 2	3–0	Chicago Fire II	Athens, Georgia
7:00 PM EDT	Kovac 54'; Dovlo 90+2'; Pita 90+3'	Report		Stadium: Turner Soccer Complex; Referee: Promise Adebayo-Ige

June 13 13	Atlanta United 2	4–4 (5–6 p)	Chattanooga FC	Athens, Georgia
7:00 PM EDT	Hanchard 57' (o.g.); Sar-Sar 68' (o.g.); Jardines 71'; Senanou 79'	Report	Krehl 40', 45+1'; Robertson 48'; Cohen 90+5'	Stadium: Turner Soccer Complex; Referee: Kyle Johnston
	Penalties
	Chong-Qui (penalty scored); Jardines (penalty scored); Dovlo (penalty scored); Majub (penalty scored); Suarez (penalty scored); Ettinger (penalty missed)		Mangarov (penalty scored); Arrúa (penalty scored); Cohen (penalty scored); García (penalty scored); Sar-Sar (penalty scored); Sorenson (penalty scored)

June 21 14	Columbus Crew 2	3–2	Atlanta United 2	Columbus, Ohio
6:00 PM EDT	Gbamblé 6'; Zengue 11'; Adams 63'	Report	Kovac 32'; Dunbar 82'	Stadium: Historic Crew Stadium; Referee: Corbyn May

June 27 15	Atlanta United 2	3–3 (3–4 p)	Crown Legacy	Athens, Georgia
7:00 PM EDT	Kovac 18', 30' (pen.); Chong-Qui 60'	Report	Ouedraogo 6'; Romero 14'; Richmond 54'	Stadium: Turner Soccer Complex; Referee: John Matto
	Penalties
	Kovac (penalty scored); Chong-Qui (penalty scored); Jardines (penalty missed); Pita (penalty missed); Gill (penalty scored)		Pena (penalty scored); John (penalty scored); Richmond (penalty scored); G. Smith (penalty missed); J. Smith (penalty scored)

July 4 16	Atlanta United 2	1–0	Toronto FC II	Athens, Georgia
7:00 PM EDT	Chica 34'	Report		Stadium: Turner Soccer Complex; Referee: Deny Kulasinac

July 11 17	Atlanta United 2	4–1	Inter Miami II	Athens, Georgia
7:00 PM EDT	Chica 20'; Suarez 51'; Hall 53' (o.g.); Kovac 62'	Report	Flores 86'	Stadium: Turner Soccer Complex; Referee: Erick Lezama Pavon

July 18 18	Huntsville City	2–0	Atlanta United 2	Huntsville, Alabama
8:00 PM EDT	Ekk 53'; Molina 70'	Report		Stadium: Joe W. Davis Stadium; Referee: Alejo Calume

July 26 19	Atlanta United 2	3–2	New York City II	Marietta, Georgia
7:00 PM EDT	Kovac 12', 66'; Butts 86'	Report	Vafiades 70'; Ponce 88'	Stadium: Children's Healthcare of Atlanta Training Ground; Referee: MJ Tehini

July 31 20	Atlanta United 2	3–3 (9–10 p)	Carolina Core	Marietta, Georgia
7:00 PM EDT	Dunbar 4'; Chong-Qui 19'; Dovlo 44'	Report	Tattevin 38' (pen.), 45+1', 50'	Stadium: Children's Healthcare of Atlanta Training Ground; Referee: William Hale
	Penalties
	Cisset (penalty scored); Chong-Qui (penalty scored); Weah (penalty scored); Riveras (penalty scored); Chica (penalty scored); Senanou (penalty scored); Fakiseyi (penalty scored); Browne (penalty scored); Jardines (penalty scored); Henry (penalty missed)		Baer (penalty scored); Diaz (penalty scored); Evers (penalty scored); Pineda (penalty scored); Lundeen (penalty scored); B. Ford (penalty scored); G. Ford (penalty scored); Tetteh (penalty scored); Montenengro (penalty scored); Swinehart (penalty scored)

August 8 21	Chattanooga FC	1–0	Atlanta United 2	Chattanooga, Tennessee
7:00 PM EDT	Krehl 7'	Report		Stadium: Finley Stadium; Referee: Laith Dahhan

August 14 22	Atlanta United 2	1–2	New York Red Bulls II	Marietta, Georgia
7:00 PM EDT	Dovlo 47'	Report	Gallagher 41'; Rojas 45+3' (pen.)	Stadium: Children's Healthcare of Atlanta Training Ground; Referee: John Tamayo

August 18 23	Atlanta United 2	2–1	Chicago Fire II	Marietta, Georgia
11:00 AM EDT	Kovac 33'; Dovlo 39'	Report	Williams 90+2'	Stadium: Children's Healthcare of Atlanta Training Ground; Referee: Dorian Del Toro

August 22 24	Atlanta United 2	5–1	Orlando City B	Marietta, Georgia
1:00 PM EDT	Dunbar 45+2', 52'; Kovac 74', 90+4'; Weah 90+2'	Report	Haruna 45+7'	Stadium: Children's Healthcare of Atlanta Training Ground; Referee: Izlen Peksenar

August 28 25	Inter Miami II	1–1 (4–5 p)	Atlanta United 2	Fort Lauderdale, Florida
7:00 PM EDT	Zeltzer-Zubida 45+3'	Report	Weah 78'	Stadium: Inter Miami CF Stadium; Referee: Servando Berna
	Penalties
	Sumalla (penalty scored); Zeltzer-Zubida (penalty missed); Rey (penalty missed); Morrison (penalty scored); Flores (penalty scored); Jena (penalty scored); Adeclat (penalty missed)		Kovac (penalty missed); Cisset (penalty scored); Dunbar (penalty scored); Sibrian (penalty scored); Weah (penalty missed); Senanou (penalty scored); Chica (penalty scored)

September 8 26	Atlanta United 2	4–1	CT United	Marietta, Georgia
2:00 PM EDT	Chica 22'; Boamah 66' (o.g.); Dunbar 85'; Kamrath 90+4' (o.g.)	Report	D'lppolito 78'	Stadium: Children's Healthcare of Atlanta Training Ground; Referee: Anthony Sobolevsky

September 13 27	Chattanooga FC	4–1	Atlanta United 2	Chattanooga, Tennessee
3:00 PM EDT	Krehl 10'; McGrath 62'; Husakiwsky 65'; Barker-John 86'	Report	Kovac 89'	Stadium: Finley Stadium; Referee: Jose Lara

September 20 28	Orlando City B	2–4	Atlanta United 2	Kissimmee, Florida
2:00 PM EDT	Haruna 18'; Hylton 45+2'	Report	Kovac 3'; Sarajian 31' (o.g.); Suarez 40'; Chong-Qui 63'	Stadium: Osceola County Stadium; Referee: Jorge Escobar

=== Playoffs ===
October 16 Conference Quarterfinals	Atlanta United 2	0–1	CT United	Marietta, Georgia
6:00 PM		Report	Tanyi 5'	Stadium: Children’s Healthcare of Atlanta Training Ground; Referee: Jaclyn Metz

== Statistics ==
=== Top scorers ===
As of 17 October 2026

Place	Position	Name	MLS Next Pro	Playoffs	Total
1	FW	(United States) Arif Kovac	20	0	20
2	MF	(United States) Cameron Dunbar	9	0	9
3	MF	(Togo) Enzo Dovlo	5	0	5
4	FW	(Guyana) Liam Butts	4	0	4
4	DF	(United States) Daniel Chica	4	0	4
6	DF	(United States) Dominik Chong-Qui	3	0	3
7	MF	(United States) Ignacio Suarez	2	0	2
7	FW	(Liberia) Patrick Weah	2	0	2
9	MF	(United States) Luke Brennan	1	0	1
9	MF	(United States) Adrian Gill	1	0	1
9	MF	(United States) Andrew Jardines	1	0	1
9	MF	(Venezuela) Santiago Pita	1	0	1
9	DF	(United States) Matthew Senanou	1	0	1
9	FW	(Japan) Cayman Togashi	1	0	1
Own Goals			7	0	7
Total			62	0	62
