= Jhon Solís =

Jhon Solís is the name of:

- Jhon Solís (sprinter) (born 1993), Colombian sprinter
- Jhon Solís (footballer, born 1999), Colombian footballer
- Jhon Solís (footballer, born 2004), Colombian footballer
