= Matías Gallardo =

Argentine footballer (born 2003)

Personal information
- Full name: Matías Valentín Gallardo
- Date of birth: 24 November 2003 (age 22)
- Place of birth: Vicente López, Buenos Aires, Argentina
- Height: 1.75 m (5 ft 9 in)
- Position: Attacking midfielder

Team information
- Current team: Instituto
- Number: 15

Youth career
- 2014–2023: River Plate

Senior career*
Years	Team	Apps	(Gls)
2023–2024	Atlanta United 2	31	(1)
2025–	Instituto	21	(1)
- * Club domestic league appearances and goals as of 18:09, 19 August 2026 (UTC)

Matías Valentín Gallardo (born 24 November 2003) is an Argentine footballer who currently plays as an attacking midfielder for Argentine Primera División side Instituto.

== Early life ==
Born in the Buenos Aires Province of Argentina, Gallardo is the son of football manager, and former Argentina international footballer, Marcelo Gallardo, and the brother of fellow footballers Nahuel and Santino Gallardo. His maternal uncle is Jonathan La Rosa, who was his manager in the River Plate reserve team.

== Club career ==
=== Early career ===
Gallardo joined the academy of River Plate in 2014, when his father was appointed manager of the club. Having progressed through the academy, he made his debut for the club on 25 March 2023 in a 4–3 friendly win against Chilean team Universidad de Chile, almost exactly thirty years after his father had made his debut for the club.

=== Atlanta United ===
In July 2023, Gallardo left River Plate, joining American club Atlanta United on a free transfer and being assigned to the club's reserve team. He made his MLS Next Pro debut the following month, coming on as a late substitute for Karim Tmimi in a 5–1 away loss to the New England Revolution II. Despite this, his start in the United States was seen as slow, and after a year in the country, he had not featured regularly.

As his form picked up, he accumulated more minutes, and in June 2024 he signed a Short-Term Agreement with Atlanta United's first team, ahead of their Major League Soccer match against D.C. United. An unused substitute against D.C. United, he would appear once more on the bench, in an 1–1 draw against St. Louis City, before being released by the club in October 2024.

=== Instituto ===
Gallardo returned to Argentina after his release, signing with Instituto on 2 January 2025. His first involvement with the first team came against his father's team, and Gallardo's former club, River Plate, though he remained on the bench for his new club's 1–0 defeat on 30 January. His debut would come in March of the same year, as a second-half substitute for Francis Mac Allister in a 2–0 loss to Argentinos Juniors.

== Career statistics ==
=== Club ===
As of 20 November 2025.

Appearances and goals by club, season and competition
Club	Season	League			National Cup		League Cup		Continental		Other		Total	
Club	Season	Division	Apps	Goals	Apps	Goals	Apps	Goals	Apps	Goals	Apps	Goals	Apps	Goals
Atlanta United 2	2023	MLS Next Pro	5	0	–		–		–		0	0	5	0
Atlanta United 2	2024	MLS Next Pro	26	1	–		–		–		0	0	26	1
Atlanta United 2	Total		31	1	0	0	0	0	0	0	0	0	31	1
Instituto	2025	Argentine Primera División	7	0	0	0	0	0	0	0	0	0	7	0
Career total			38	1	0	0	0	0	0	0	0	0	38	1
