= Luke Brennan (soccer, born 2005) =

American soccer player (born 2005)

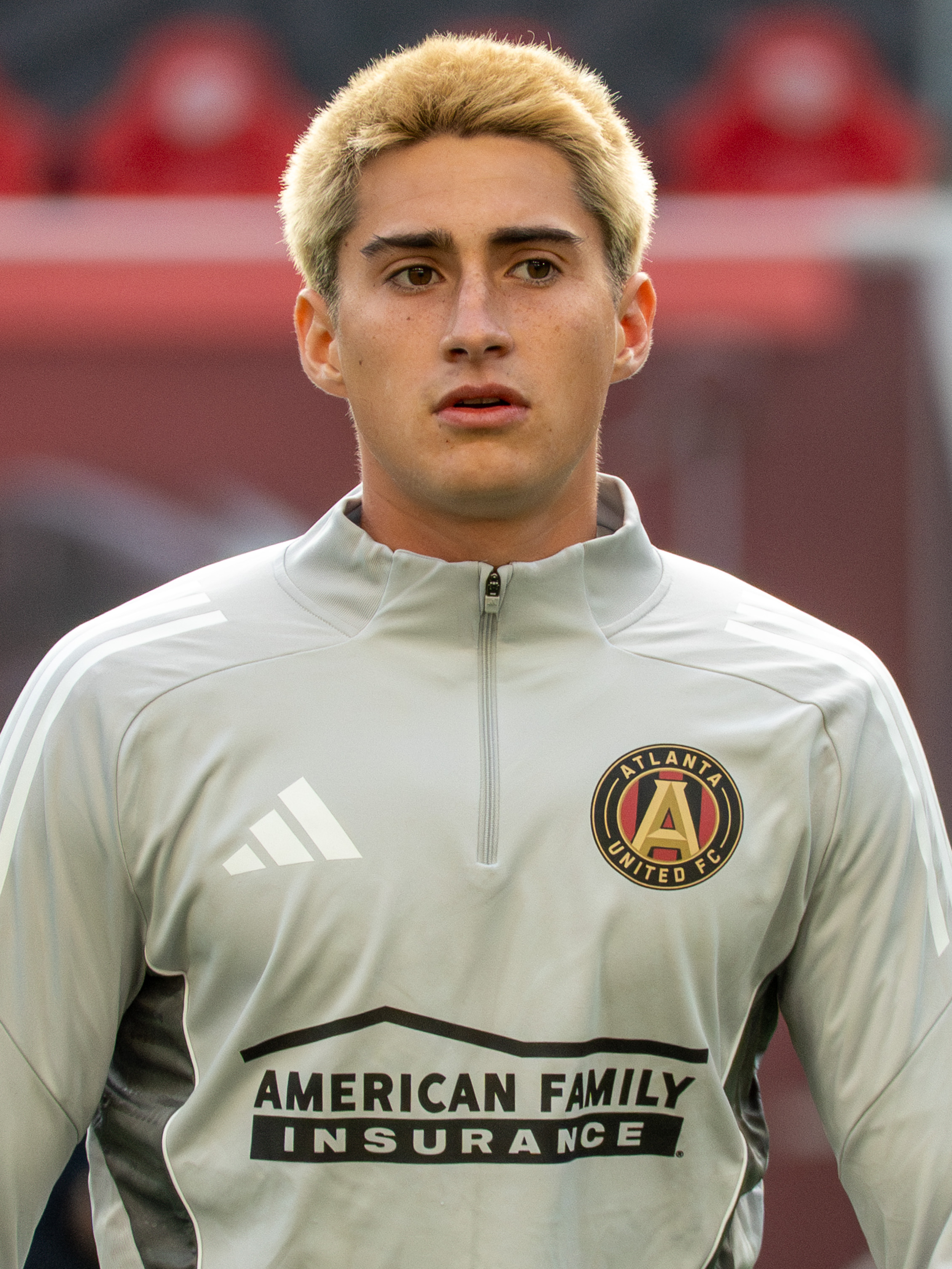
- Brennan in 2025

Personal information
- Full name: Luke Brennan
- Date of birth: February 24, 2005 (age 21)
- Place of birth: Atlanta, Georgia, United States
- Height: 5 ft 11 in (1.80 m)
- Position: Midfielder

Team information
- Current team: Atlanta United
- Number: 20

Youth career
- 2017–2023: Atlanta United

Senior career*
Years	Team	Apps	(Gls)
2021–	Atlanta United 2	74	(13)
2024–	Atlanta United	42	(0)

International career^{‡}
2024	United States U20	14	(2)
- * Club domestic league appearances and goals as of November 15, 2026 ‡ National team caps and goals as of October 10, 2025

Luke Brennan (born February 24, 2005) is an American professional soccer player who plays as a midfielder for Major League Soccer club Atlanta United.

== Club career ==
=== Early career ===
Brennan joined the Atlanta United academy at the age of 12, just before the professional outfit began their inaugural Major League Soccer season.

In October 2021, Brennan made his professional debut with Atlanta's USL Championship affiliate, starting and playing 60 minutes in a 4–2 defeat to Memphis 901.

During the 2022 season, Brennan was a regular for the second team making 27 appearances and scoring 2 goals as well as playing for the academy. In January 2023, Brennan was invited to participate in Atlanta United's preseason camp for the first team. In the 2023 American Family Insurance Cup against Liga MX side Toluca, Brennan scored coming off the bench.

=== Professional career ===
On March 9, 2023, Brennan signed his first professional contract with Atlanta United 2 who would be making their debut in MLS Next Pro. It was also announced that Brennan would become a Homegrown Player for Atlanta United on January 1, 2024, becoming the club's 16th homegrown.

He made his MLS debut on June 21, 2023, coming on as a substitute for Amar Sejdić in the 87th minute in a match that ended 2–2 at home against New York City FC. This appearance made Brennan only the second Native American player to appear in a Major League Soccer match.

== International career ==
Brennan was called up to the U-19 U.S. men's national team on July 22, 2022, for a training camp in Carson, California.

== Personal life ==
Brennan is Native American and a member of the Delaware Nation, with roots through his maternal grandmother who was relocated to Los Angeles due to the Indian Relocation Act of 1956.

== Career statistics ==
=== Club ===
As of July 10, 2026

Appearances and goals by club, season and competition
Club	Season	League			Cup		Continental		Other		Total	
Club	Season	Division	Apps	Goals	Apps	Goals	Apps	Goals	Apps	Goals	Apps	Goals
Atlanta United 2	2021	USL	1	0	—		—		—		1	0
Atlanta United 2	2022	USL	27	2	—		—		—		27	2
Atlanta United 2	2023	MLS Next Pro	25	4	—		—		—		25	4
Atlanta United 2	2024	MLS Next Pro	12	4							12	4
Atlanta United 2	2025	MLS Next Pro	6	2							6	2
Atlanta United 2	2026	MLS Next Pro	2	1							2	1
Atlanta United 2	Total		73	13	—		—		—		73	13
Atlanta United	2023	MLS	1	0	0	0	—		—		1	0
Atlanta United	2024	MLS	7	0	3	0					10	0
Atlanta United	2025	MLS	14	0			3	0			17	0
Atlanta United	2026	MLS	7	0	3	0					10	0
Atlanta United	Total		29	0	6	0	3	0	—		38	0
Career total			102	13	6	0	3	0	0	0	111	13
