= Efrain Morales =

Bolivian footballer (born 2004)

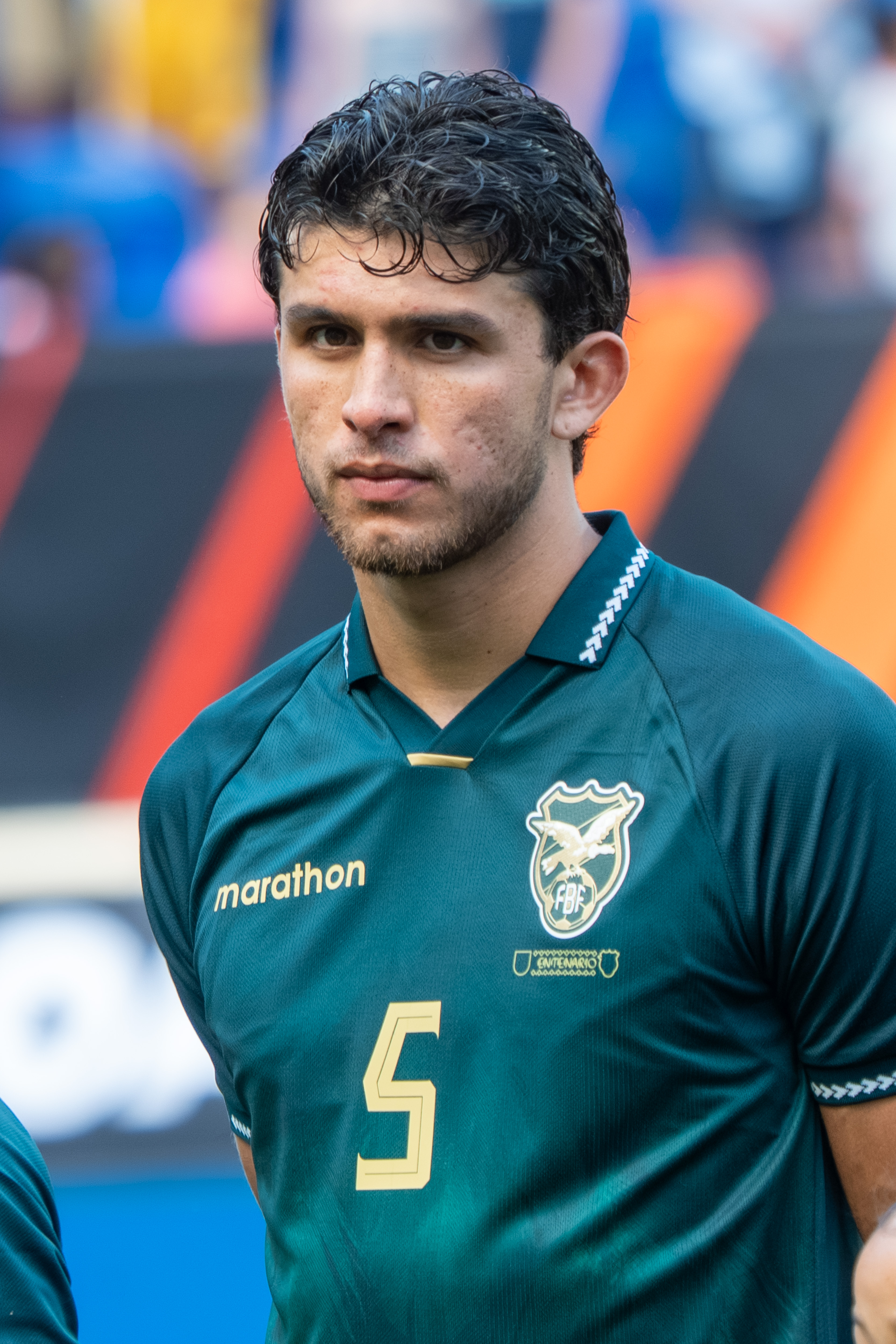
- Morales with Bolivia in 2026

Personal information
- Full name: Efraín Andrés Morales Badillo
- Date of birth: March 4, 2004 (age 22)
- Place of birth: Decatur, Georgia, U.S.
- Height: 6 ft 3 in (1.91 m)
- Position: Centre-back

Team information
- Current team: CF Montréal
- Number: 24

Youth career
- 2016–2021: Atlanta United

Senior career*
Years	Team	Apps	(Gls)
2020–2025	Atlanta United	9	(0)
2020–2025	→ Atlanta United 2 (loan)	74	(3)
2025–	CF Montréal	23	(0)

International career^{‡}
2023	Bolivia U20	6	(0)
2024–	Bolivia	14	(0)
- * Club domestic league appearances and goals as of 19 September 2026 ‡ National team caps and goals as of 30 September 2026

Efraín Andrés Morales Badillo (born March 4, 2004) is a professional footballer who plays as a centre-back for Major League Soccer club CF Montréal. Born in the United States, he plays for the Bolivia national team.

== Club career ==
Morales joined in the youth academy of Major League Soccer club Atlanta United in 2016. Morales began at the under-12 level but quickly progressed to the under-17 side. After impressing coaches in the youth setup, Morales signed a professional homegrown player contract with Atlanta United on August 13, 2020, which will come into effect on January 1, 2021.

On August 15, 2020, Morales made his professional debut for Atlanta United 2, Atlanta United's reserve team in the USL Championship, against Charleston Battery. He came on as a 22nd-minute substitute for Patrick Nielsen and scored his first professional goal in the 51st minute. Despite the goal, Atlanta United 2 lost 3–2.

Morales signed a contract extension with Atlanta United on November 29, 2023.

On July 23, 2025, Morales was transferred to fellow MLS club CF Montréal.

== International career ==
Morales was eligible to play for Bolivia national team and Puerto Rico due to his mother. Morales made his Bolivia national team debut on 14 November 2024 in a World Cup qualifier against Ecuador at Estadio Monumental Isidro Romero Carbo. He played the full game as Ecuador won 4–0.

== Personal life ==
Born in Decatur, Georgia, Morales is the son of a Puerto Rican mother and a Bolivian father.

== Career statistics ==
=== Club ===
As of match played September 19, 2026

Appearances and goals by club, season and competition
Club	Season	League			National cup		Other		Total	
Club	Season	Division	Apps	Goals	Apps	Goals	Apps	Goals	Apps	Goals
Atlanta United 2	2020	USL Championship	4	1	—		—		4	1
Atlanta United 2	2021	USL Championship	6	0	—		—		6	0
Atlanta United 2	2022	USL Championship	24	0	—		—		24	0
Atlanta United 2	2023	USL Championship	20	1	—		—		20	1
Atlanta United 2	2024	USL Championship	15	1	—		—		15	1
Atlanta United 2	2025	USL Championship	5	0	—		—		5	0
Atlanta United 2	Total		74	3	—		—		74	3
Atlanta United	2024	MLS	4	0	3	0	0	0	7	0
Atlanta United	2025	MLS	5	0	0	0	0	0	5	0
Atlanta United	Total		9	0	3	0	0	0	12	0
CF Montréal	2025	MLS	6	0	0	0	2 (Note: Appearances in Leagues Cup)	1	8	1
CF Montréal	2026	MLS	17	0	0	0	3 (Note: Appearances in Canadian Championship)	0	20	0
CF Montréal	Total		23	0	0	0	5	1	28	1
Career total			106	3	0	3	5	1	114	4

=== International ===
As of match played September 30, 2026

Appearances and goals by national team and year
National team	Year	Apps	Goals
Bolivia	2024	2	0
Bolivia	2025	6	0
Bolivia	2026	6	0
Total		14	0
