= Ramzi Qawasmy =

American soccer player

Personal information
- Full name: Ramzi Qawasmy
- Date of birth: November 30, 1999 (age 26)
- Place of birth: Lansdale, Pennsylvania, United States
- Height: 6 ft 1 in (1.85 m)
- Position: Defender

Youth career
- –2017: FC Delco
- 2017–2018: Philadelphia Union

College career
Years	Team	Apps	(Gls)
2018–2022	Providence Friars	88	(7)

Senior career*
Years	Team	Apps	(Gls)
2021	Reading United	9	(0)
2022	West Chester United	8	(0)
2023	Louisville City	2	(0)
2024	Atlanta United 2	18	(0)
2025	Philadelphia Union II	2	(0)
- * Club domestic league appearances and goals as of June 3, 2025

Ramzi Qawasmy (born November 30, 1999) is an American professional soccer player who plays as a defender.

== Club career ==
=== Youth and college ===
Qawasmy played club soccer with FC Delco, briefly known as Continental FC, before joining the Philadelphia Union academy in the summer of 2017. He went on to play one season with the Union before committing to play college soccer at Providence College.

In 2018, Qawasmy began his college career at Providence, where he went on to make 88 appearances, scoring seven goals and tallying a single assist in a five-year career, which included a truncated 2020 season due to the COVID-19 pandemic. In those five seasons, he also earned numerous awards including BIG EAST All-Freshman Team in 2018, All-BIG EAST Second Team in 2020–21, All-BIG EAST First Team and United Soccer Coaches All-East Region First Team in 2021, and All-BIG EAST Second Team in 2022, as well as being named to the 2022 Hermann Trophy Watch List.

While at college, Qawasmy also appeared in the USL League Two with Reading United in 2021 and West Chester United in 2022.

Following college, Qaqasmy was eligible for selection in the 2023 MLS SuperDraft, but went undrafted.

=== Professional ===
On February 24, 2023, Qawasmy was announced as a new signing for USL Championship side Louisville City following a successful trial ahead of their 2023 season. He made his professional debut on March 25, 2023, starting in a 3–0 loss at home to El Paso Locomotive. He was released by Louisville following the 2023 season. On April 5, 2024, Qawasmy signed with MLS Next Pro side Atlanta United 2.
