= Noble Okello =

Ugandan footballer (born 2000)

Personal information
- Full name: Noble Okello Ayo
- Date of birth: July 20, 2000 (age 26)
- Place of birth: Toronto, Ontario, Canada
- Height: 1.95 m (6 ft 5 in)
- Position: Midfielder

Team information
- Current team: Lexington SC
- Number: 15

Youth career
- North York Hearts
- Mooredale SC
- 2013–2018: Toronto FC

Senior career*
Years	Team	Apps	(Gls)
2016–2018	Toronto FC III	16	(1)
2017–2018	Toronto FC II	23	(0)
2019–2022	Toronto FC	23	(1)
2019	→ Toronto FC II (loan)	19	(0)
2020	→ HB Køge (loan)	12	(1)
2021	→ Toronto FC II (loan)	3	(1)
2023	New England Revolution II	10	(1)
2024	Atlanta United 2	26	(3)
2025	Phoenix Rising	24	(2)
2026	Indy Eleven	16	(1)
2026–	Lexington SC	7	(0)

International career^{‡}
2016	Canada U17	3	(0)
2018	Canada U20	5	(3)
2018	Canada U21	4	(0)
2020	Canada	2	(0)
2026–	Uganda	2	(0)
- * Club domestic league appearances and goals as of 11:25, 9 November 2026 (UTC) ‡ National team caps and goals as of September 29, 2026

Noble Okello Ayo (born July 20, 2000) is a professional soccer player who plays as a midfielder for Lexington SC of the USL Championship. Born in Canada and a former international for the Canada national team, he represents Uganda at the international level.

== Early life ==
Okello began playing soccer at age six with the North York Hearts SC. He later played for Mooredale SC before joining the Toronto FC Academy in 2013.

On August 20, 2017, he was part of the U17 side that beat Juventus U17 to capture the inaugural International Youth Soccer Cup.

== Club career ==
=== Toronto FC ===
In 2016, he appeared in one match for Toronto FC III in League1 Ontario. In 2017, he scored one goal in 13 appearances and made a further two appearances in 2018.

In September 2017, Okello signed his first professional contract with Toronto FC II in the USL. On October 6, 2017, he made his professional debut against Bethlehem Steel FC. Following the conclusion of USL season, Okello was invited to train with the U19 team of VfL Wolfsburg.

On January 10, 2018, he played a full 90 minutes for their U19 side in a 2–1 victory over Hallescher FC where he scored the equalizing goal in the 88th minute He then returned to Toronto, to join the Toronto FC first team's 2018 pre-season training camp. It was later reported that VfL Wolfsburg had made three separate transfer bids to sign Okello, which would see his club receive a six figure transfer fee in addition to appearance fees and sell on percentage fee.

In January 2019, Okello signed a first-team contract with Toronto FC in Major League Soccer. He made his first-team debut for Toronto on August 14 against Ottawa Fury FC in the second leg of their 2019 Canadian Championship semi-final series.

He made his MLS debut on July 21, 2020, against the New England Revolution. He was loaned to the second team for some matches in 2021. He scored his first goal for TFCII on June 30, converting a penalty kick against Tormenta FC. Upon completion of the 2021 season, Okello's option for the 2022 season would be picked up by Toronto.

After appearing in four of the first five matches of the 2022 season, Okello suffered an injury that kept him out of action for five months. After the end of the 2022 season, he departed the club, upon the expiry of his contract.

==== Loan to HB Køge ====
On September 25, 2020, Okello was sent out on loan to Danish 1st Division club HB Køge, the same club that his teammate Rocco Romeo was also on loan with. On September 30, he made his debut for Køge, coming on as a second-half substitute and scored a goal from 35 metres out.

=== MLS Next Pro ===
In February 2023, he went on trial with MLS club LA Galaxy. Afterwards, he went on trial with the New England Revolution. In March 2023, he signed a contract with their second team, New England Revolution II, in MLS Next Pro.

In December 2023, he signed a contract with Atlanta United 2 for the 2024 season. He scored his first goal on May 8, 2024 against Carolina Core FC.

=== USL Championship ===
Okello signed with Phoenix Rising FC in the USL Championship on December 27, 2024. On March 15, 2025, he scored his first goal for the club in a 4-4 draw with El Paso Locomotive FC.

In January 2026, he signed with Indy Eleven for the 2026 season.

In August 2026, Lexington SC announced they had acquired Okello via permanent transfer from Indy Eleven.

== International career ==
Born to Ugandan parents, Okello was eligible to represent either Canada or Uganda at the international level.

=== Canada ===
Okello made his debut in the Canadian youth system attending a camp in September 2016 with the Canada U17 team. He was named to the roster for the 2017 CONCACAF U-17 Championship, where he made his international debut on April 22, 2017 against Costa Rica U17.

In May 2018, Okello was called up to the Canadian U21 side for the 2018 Toulon Tournament. In October 2018, Okello was named to the Canadian U20 squad for the 2018 CONCACAF U-20 Championship. He scored a brace in the tournament opener against Dominica, a 4–0 victory. Okello was named to the Canadian U-23 provisional roster for the 2020 CONCACAF Men's Olympic Qualifying Championship on February 26, 2020.

Okello was named to the Canadian senior team for the 2019 CONCACAF Gold Cup. Okello made his senior debut on January 7, 2020, against Barbados as a substitute in a 4–1 victory.

=== Uganda ===
Okello was called up to the Uganda senior team for the first time on May 23, 2026, ahead of friendlies against Tanzania and Madagascar.

== Career statistics ==
=== Club ===
As of match played May 30, 2026

Club	Season	League			Playoffs		National Cup		League Cup		Continental		Total	
Club	Season	Division	Apps	Goals	Apps	Goals	Apps	Goals	Apps	Goals	Apps	Goals	Apps	Goals
Toronto FC III	2016	League1 Ontario	1	0	—		—		1	0	—		2	0
Toronto FC III	2017	League1 Ontario	13	1	—		—		0	0	—		13	1
Toronto FC III	2018	League1 Ontario	2	0	—		—		1	0	—		3	0
Toronto FC III	Total		16	1	0	0	0	0	2	0	—		18	1
Toronto FC II	2017	USL	1	0	—		—		—		—		1	0
Toronto FC II	2018	USL	22	0	—		—		—		—		22	0
Toronto FC II	2019	USL League One	19	0	—		—		—		—		19	0
Toronto FC II	2021	USL League One	3	1	—		—		—		—		3	1
Toronto FC II	Total		45	1	0	0	0	0	0	0	0	0	45	1
Toronto FC	2019	MLS	0	0	0	0	1	0	—		0	0	1	0
Toronto FC	2020	MLS	1 (Note: Includes one appearance in the MLS is Back Tournament group stage.)	0	0	0	0	0	—		—		1	0
Toronto FC	2021	MLS	14	1	—		3	1	—		3 (Note: Appearance(s) in the CONCACAF Champions League.)	0	20	2
Toronto FC	2022	MLS	8	0	—		0	0	—		—		8	0
Toronto FC	Total		23	1	0	0	4	1	0	0	3	0	30	2
HB Køge (loan)	2020–21	Danish 1st Division	12	1	—		2	0	0	0	—		14	1
New England Revolution II	2023	MLS Next Pro	10	1	2	0	—		—		—		12	1
Atlanta United 2	2024	MLS Next Pro	26	3	0	0	—		—		—		26	3
Phoenix Rising	2025	USL Championship	24	2	1	0	2	0	2	0	—		29	2
Indy Eleven	2026	USL Championship	9	1	0	0	2	1	2	0	—		13	2
Career total			165	11	3	0	10	2	6	0	3	0	182	13

=== International ===
As of 29 September 2026

Canada
Year	Apps	Goals
2020	2	0
Total	2	0
Uganda
Year	Apps	Goals
2026	2	0
Total	2	0
