= Dominik Chong-Qui =

American soccer player (born 2007)

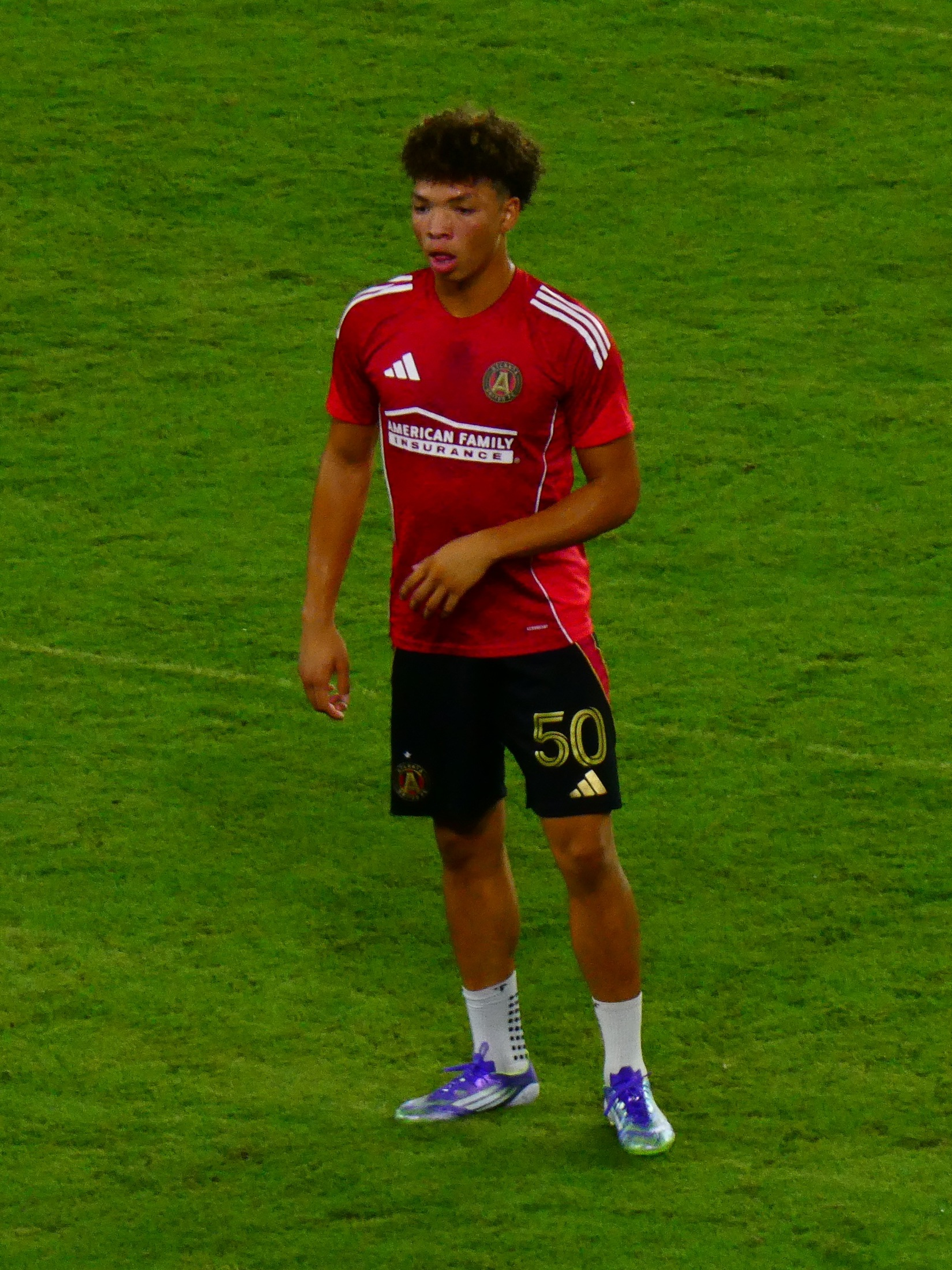
- Chong-Qui with Atlanta United in 2025

Personal information
- Date of birth: December 27, 2007 (age 18)
- Place of birth: Alpharetta, Georgia, U.S.
- Height: 1.75 m (5 ft 9 in)
- Position: Left-back

Team information
- Current team: Atlanta United
- Number: 50

Youth career
- –2022: Georgia Express
- 2022–2024: Atlanta United

Senior career*
Years	Team	Apps	(Gls)
2024–	Atlanta United 2	61	(5)
2025–	Atlanta United	3	(0)

International career^{‡}
2025–	United States U18	4	(0)
2026–	United States U19	1	(0)
- * Club domestic league appearances and goals as of 13:28, 15 November 2026 (UTC) ‡ National team caps and goals as of 00:17, September 20, 2026 (UTC)

Dominik Chong-Qui (born December 27, 2007) is an American professional soccer player who plays as a left-back for Major League Soccer club Atlanta United.

== Club career ==
=== Atlanta United ===
Chong-Qui joined the youth academy of Atlanta United in 2022 and was part of the U-16 team which won the 2023 MLS NEXT Cup Championship. In 2024 while still in the academy, Chong-Qui played for the club's reserve team, debuting in June. He signed a second-team contract in December 2024 that would turn into a first-team, homegrown deal in 2026. On March 1, 2025, he signed a short-term agreement with the first-team and made his debut during a 2–0 away loss to Charlotte FC On March 30, he signed another short-term agreement with Atlanta United and collected his first start during a 4–3 home win over New York City FC. Chong-Qui signed a full first-team contract with Atlanta United on April 4, 2025.

== Style of play ==
Described as a “rapid and physically imposing fullback,” Chong-Qui was praised by head coach Ronny Deila during the 2025 preseason, with the manager stating: "The special thing is his physique. He’s so quick, he’s good 1v1, and he’s mature in what he’s doing. So that is special.”

== Personal life ==
Born in the United States, Chong-Qui is of Trinidadian and distant Chinese descent.
