= Jayden Hibbert =

Jamaican footballer (born 2004)

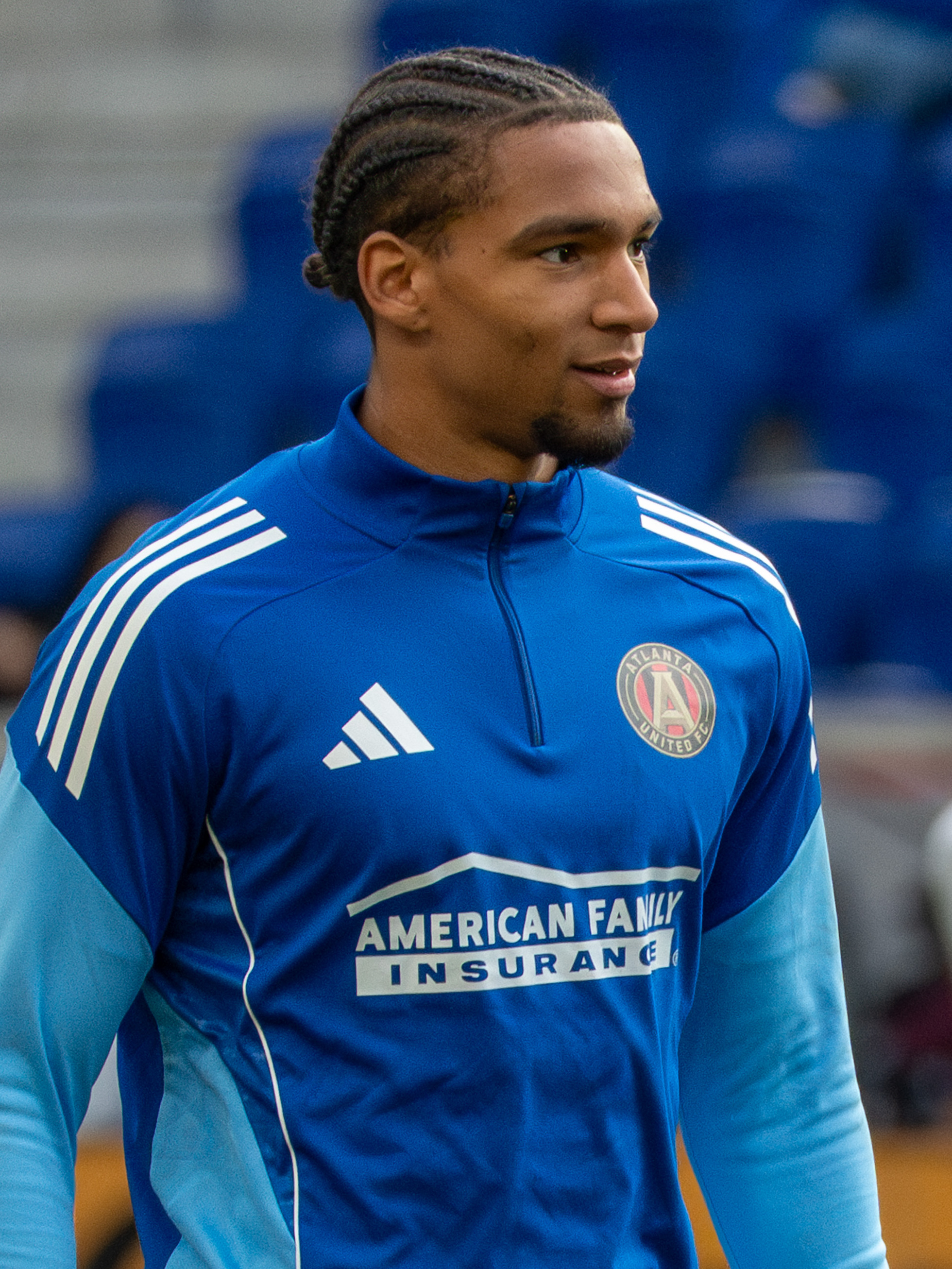
- Hibbert in 2025

Personal information
- Date of birth: August 5, 2004 (age 22)
- Place of birth: Teaneck, New Jersey, United States
- Height: 6 ft 2 in (1.88 m)
- Position: Goalkeeper

Team information
- Current team: Atlanta United
- Number: 42

Youth career
- New York Red Bulls
- Cedar Stars Academy

College career
Years	Team	Apps	(Gls)
2022–2023	UConn Huskies	20	(0)

Senior career*
Years	Team	Apps	(Gls)
2021–2022	Cedar Stars Rush	3	(0)
2024–	Atlanta United 2	33	(0)
2024	→ Birmingham Legion (loan)	4	(0)
2025–	Atlanta United	9	(0)

International career^{‡}
2024	Jamaica	2	(0)
2025	Canada	0	(0)
- * Club domestic league appearances and goals as of 13:25, 15 November 2026 (UTC) ‡ National team caps and goals as of October 10, 2026

Jayden Hibbert (born August 5, 2004) is a professional footballer who plays as a goalkeeper for Major League Soccer club Atlanta United. Born in the United States, he has represented Jamaica at international level. In 2025, he was also called up to Canada.

== Early life ==
Born in Teaneck, New Jersey, Hibbert attended St. Benedict's Preparatory School. He played youth soccer with ODP, Next Gen, the New York Red Bulls Academy, and the Cedar Stars Academy.

== College career ==
In 2022, Hibbert began attending the University of Connecticut, where he played for the men's soccer team. During the 2023 season, he was named the Big East Conference Goalkeeper of the Week twice. After the 2023 season, he was invited to attend the MLS College Showcase.

== Club career ==
Hibbert played with the Cedar Stars Rush in USL League Two in 2021 and 2022.

At the 2024 MLS SuperDraft, Hibbert was selected in the first round (19th overall) by Atlanta United FC.

In January 2024, he signed a professional contract with their second team, Atlanta United 2, in MLS Next Pro.

In June 2024, he was sent on loan to the Birmingham Legion in the USL Championship for the remainder of the 2024 season. He made his debut for Birmingham on June 19, posting a clean sheet in a 3–0 victory over San Antonio FC. On July 10, he was recalled from his loan by Atlanta.

Ahead of the 2025 season, he was promoted to a first-team contract with Atlanta United FC. On July 13, 2025, he made his Major League Soccer debut with the first team against Toronto FC.

== International career ==
Hibbert was born in the United States to a Jamaican father, and Canadian mother; he also holds Ukrainian roots through his maternal grandparents who emigrated to Canada. He holds Canadian, American and Jamaican citizenship, and is eligible for their national teams.

=== Jamaica ===
In March 2024, he was called up to the Jamaica national team for a pair of friendlies against Trinidad and Tobago. He made appearances in both matches.

=== Canada ===
In August 2025, he was called up to the Canada national team for a pair of friendlies in September.
