= João Guilherme (footballer, born 2000) =

Brazilian footballer (born 2000)

Personal information
- Full name: João Guilherme de Souza Crispim
- Date of birth: 30 October 2000 (age 26)
- Place of birth: Teresina, Brazil
- Height: 1.80 m (5 ft 11 in)
- Position: Winger

Team information
- Current team: Académico de Viseu
- Number: 31

Youth career
- 2017: Três Passos
- 2020: Fluminense-PI

Senior career*
Years	Team	Apps	(Gls)
2018	Três Passos	0	(0)
2019–2020	Flamengo-PI	8	(0)
2020	Primavera	0	(0)
2021	Flamengo-PI	1	(0)
2021	Íbis	11	(1)
2022	Retrô	16	(2)
2022	Maguary-PE	6	(0)
2023	Concórdia	10	(0)
2023	Atlético Cearense	14	(1)
2024	Ferroviário-CE	5	(0)
2024	Águia de Marabá	1	(0)
2024	Atlético-PI	5	(2)
2025–2026	Maguary-PE	11	(2)
2025	→ Água Santa (loan)	12	(7)
2025–2026	→ Académico de Viseu (loan)	30	(5)
2026–	Académico de Viseu	11	(3)
- * Club domestic league appearances and goals as of 20:33, 13 November 2026 (UTC)

João Guilherme de Souza Crispim (born 30 October 2000), known as João Guilherme, is a Brazilian professional footballer who plays as a winger for Portuguese club Académico de Viseu.

== Career ==
Born in Teresina in the state of Piauí, João Guilherme spent his early career at a number of lower-league clubs in Brazil. He began his career at Três Passos in Rio Grande do Sul, and played for Íbis, the self-styled "worst team in the world". In 2025, he played for Maguary-PE and reached the semi-finals of the Campeonato Pernambucano, before being loaned to Água Santa of the Campeonato Brasileiro Série D, totalling 23 games and nine goals between the two.

João Guilherme was loaned to Académico de Viseu in Liga Portugal 2 on 30 August 2025. On 13 December, he scored his first goals with two in a 3–0 home win over Farense. He scored and assisted five goals each in 30 games in 2025–26, as his side won promotion in second place and returned to the Primeira Liga for the first time in 37 years.

João Guilherme then signed a permanent three-year contract for a fee of €300,000. On 7 September 2026, he scored his first national top-flight goal on the fifth matchday of the season against Gil Vicente, giving Académico their first win of the campaign. He scored twice in a 2–1 win away to Sporting CP on 25 October, giving the Lisbon side their first defeat of the season.

== Personal life ==
João Guilherme is the son of fellow footballer Batistinha, who won three consecutive Campeonato Piauiense titles in the 1980s with Flamengo-PI. His grandfather Batista was a goalkeeper for teams in the same state.
