= Juan Gutierrez (footballer, born 2005) =

Colombian footballer

Personal information
- Full name: Juan Esteban Gutierrez Ruiz
- Date of birth: 23 February 2005 (age 21)
- Place of birth: Cereté, Colombia
- Height: 1.85 m (6 ft 1 in)
- Position: Defender

Youth career
- 2021–2023: AA de Fútbol Popayán
- Red Bull Bragantino

Senior career*
Years	Team	Apps	(Gls)
2023–2025	New York Red Bulls II	68	(5)
- * Club domestic league appearances and goals as of 14:40, 9 November 2025 (UTC)

Juan Esteban Gutierrez Ruiz (born 23 February 2005) is a Colombian professional footballer who plays as a defender.

== Career ==
=== Early career ===
Born in Cereté, Juan Gutierez began his youth career with Club Área Chica de Montería before joining Academia Alemana de Fútbol Popayán in 2021. His play with Popayán caught the attention of Brazilian side Red Bull Bragantino, which invited Gutierrez to play the FAM Cup with the Bragantino Under-17 side.

==== New York Red Bulls II ====
On 15 April 2023, Gutierrez signed with New York Red Bulls II to compete in MLS Next Pro. Gutierrez made his debut for the team on 14 May 2023, appearing as a starter in a 2–0 derby victory over New York City FC II.

== Career statistics ==
As of match played 8 November 2025

Appearances and goals by club, season and competition
Club	Season	League			U.S. Open Cup		Play-offs		Continental		Total	
Club	Season	Division	Apps	Goals	Apps	Goals	Apps	Goals	Apps	Goals	Apps	Goals
New York Red Bulls II	2023	MLS Next Pro	19	0	0	0	2	0	0	0	21	0
New York Red Bulls II	2024	MLS Next Pro	26	3	1	0	0	0	—		27	3
New York Red Bulls II	2025	MLS Next Pro	23	2	0	0	4	0	—		27	2
Career total			68	5	1	0	6	0	0	0	75	5
