= Emenike Nwogu =

Nigerian footballer

Personal information
- Date of birth: 25 August 2003 (age 23)
- Place of birth: Kaduna, Nigeria
- Position: Midfielder

Youth career
- –2022: Super Star Academy

Senior career*
Years	Team	Apps	(Gls)
2022–2023	Atlanta United 2	5	(0)

International career
- Nigeria U17
- * Club domestic league appearances and goals as of 17 November 2023

Emenike Nwogu (born 25 August 2003) is a Nigerian footballer who plays as a midfielder.

== Club career ==
In March 2022, Nwogu signed with USL Championship club Atlanta United 2 from the Super Sport Academy in Nigeria. He debuted for Atlanta on 9 April 2022, appearing as an 81st–minute substitute during a 4–0 loss to Detroit City FC.
