= David Mejía (footballer) =

Peruvian footballer (born 2003)

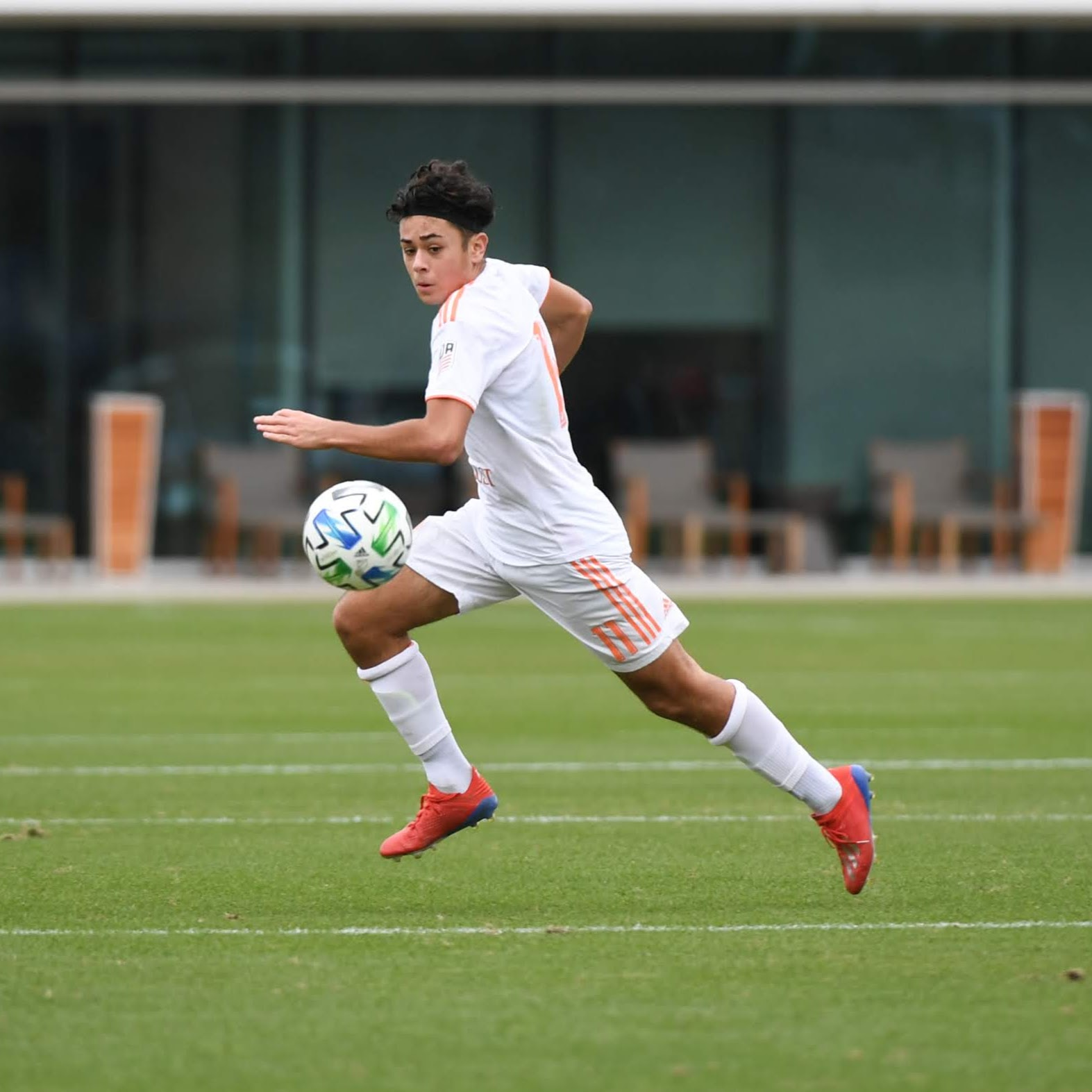

Personal information
- Full name: David Johan Mejía Crawford
- Date of birth: August 23, 2003 (age 23)
- Place of birth: Lima, Peru
- Height: 5 ft 8 in (1.73 m)
- Position: Midfielder

Youth career
- USMP
- 2014–2017: Jacksonville Armada
- 2018–2020: Atlanta United

Senior career*
Years	Team	Apps	(Gls)
2020–2023	Atlanta United 2	60	(8)
2024	Miami FC	5	(0)

International career
2022–	Peru U-20	5	(0)
- * Club domestic league appearances and goals as of 31 October 2024

David Johan Mejía Crawford (born August 23, 2003) is a Peruvian professional footballer who plays as a midfielder.

Mejía joined the Atlanta United FC Academy in 2018, after moving to the Atlanta area from Jacksonville, Florida.

== Career statistics ==
=== Club ===
As of September 24, 2020.

Club	Season	League			Cup		Other		Total	
Club	Season	Division	Apps	Goals	Apps	Goals	Apps	Goals	Apps	Goals
Atlanta United 2	2020	USL Championship	10	3	–		0	0	10	3
Career total			10	3	0	0	0	0	10	3
