= Jackson Conway =

American soccer player

Personal information
- Date of birth: December 3, 2001 (age 24)
- Place of birth: Leeds, England
- Height: 6 ft 3 in (1.91 m)
- Position: Forward

Youth career
- 2015–2016: Georgia United
- 2016–2018: Atlanta United

Senior career*
Years	Team	Apps	(Gls)
2018–2023	Atlanta United 2	88	(28)
2020–2023	Atlanta United	12	(1)
2023	→ Phoenix Rising (loan)	8	(0)
2024–2025	Charleston Battery	33	(4)

International career
2016	United States U16	2	(0)
- * Club domestic league appearances and goals as of October 25, 2025

Jackson Conway (born December 3, 2001) is a professional soccer player who plays as a forward. Born in England, he represented the United States at youth level.

== Early and personal life ==
Conway was born on December 3, 2001, in Leeds, England. He moved to the United States at a young age, growing up Marrietta, Georgia. He holds both British and American citizenships.

== Career ==
Conway played with Atlanta United academy while also appearing for Atlanta's USL Championship affiliate Atlanta United 2 during their inaugural season in 2018. On December 20, 2018, Conway signed his first professional contract with Atlanta United 2.

On December 3, 2020, Conway signed a homegrown player deal with Major League Soccer club Atlanta United. Conway made his debut for Atlanta United on 16 December 2020, coming off the bench against Club América in the CONCACAF Champions League, scoring the game-winning goal in a 1–0 victory. On July 8, 2021, Conway scored his first Major League Soccer goal, an equalizer in Atlanta's 2–2 draw against Nashville SC.

On March 29, 2022, Conway was named USL Championship Player of the Week for Week 3 of the 2022 season. Conway earned the award after scoring the 100th hat trick in USL Championship history, part of a 4–1 victory for Atlanta United 2 over the Charleston Battery.

On March 17, 2023, Atlanta United loaned Conway to the USL Championship's Phoenix Rising. On June 9, 2023, Atlanta announced that it had recalled Conway, subsequently sending him to its MLS Next Pro on a season-long loan with a right to recall him to the first team.

Conway signed with Charleston Battery of the USL Championship on January 19, 2024. Conway was released by Charleston following their 2025 season.

== Career statistics ==
As of February 25, 2023

Appearances and goals by club, season and competition
Club	Season	League			National cup		Other		Total	
Club	Season	Division	Apps	Goals	Apps	Goals	Apps	Goals	Apps	Goals
Atlanta United 2	2018	United Soccer League	11	0	—		—		11	0
Atlanta United 2	2019	USL Championship	22	5	—		—		22	5
Atlanta United 2	2020	USL Championship	10	6	—		—		10	6
Atlanta United 2	2021	USL Championship	6	1	—		—		6	1
Atlanta United 2	2022	USL Championship	24	10	—		—		24	10
Atlanta United 2	Total		73	22	—		—		73	22
Atlanta United	2020	Major League Soccer	0	0	—		1 (Note: Appearance(s) in CONCACAF Champions League)	1	1	1
Atlanta United	2021	Major League Soccer	8	1	—		—		8	1
Atlanta United	2022	Major League Soccer	3	0	—		—		3	0
Atlanta United	2023	Major League Soccer	1	0	—		—		1	0
Atlanta United	Total		12	1	—		1	1	13	2
Career total			85	23	0	0	1	1	86	24
