= Toni Tiente =

Cameroonian footballer (born 1997)

Personal information
- Full name: Toni Tiente Tiente
- Date of birth: 25 October 1997 (age 29)
- Place of birth: Cameroon
- Height: 5 ft 11 in (1.80 m)
- Position: Midfielder

Youth career
- 2011–2015: Paris FC

College career
Years	Team	Apps	(Gls)
2017–2021	Georgia Gwinnett Grizzlies	70	(21)

Senior career*
Years	Team	Apps	(Gls)
2018–2019	Georgia Revolution	23	(3)
2022–2023	Atlanta United 2	45	(0)

International career
2014	Cameroon U20		
- * Club domestic league appearances and goals as of 17 November 2023

Toni Tiente Tiente (born 25 October 1997) is a Cameroonian professional footballer who plays as a midfielder.

== Career ==
=== Early career ===
Born in Cameroon, but raised in Paris, France, Tiente was part of the Paris FC academy team, appearing on the bench for the club's reserve team in the Championnat National 3 on two occasions in 2015.

In 2017, Tiente moved to the United States to play college soccer at Georgia Gwinnett College. In four seasons with the Grizzlies, Tiente made 70 appearances, scoring 21 goals and tallying 25 assists. He was also a 2020 NAIA and United Soccer Coaches All-America first team selection, set the program's single-season record with 11 assists during 2018 season, won two Association of Independent Institutions titles and helped the Grizzlies reach the Round of 16 at the NAIA national tournament in 2018 and 2019.

While at college, Tiente also appeared for NPSL side Georgia Revolution, where he made 23 appearances and scored three goals across 2018 and 2019. In 2019, he was named to the NPSL Region XI for the South Region.

=== Senior career ===
In 2022, Tiente played with UPSL side Kalonji Pro-Profile, before signing a short-term deal with USL Championship club Atlanta United 2 on 24 June 2022. On 19 July 2022, Atlanta made Tiente's move permanent.

== International career ==
In 2014, Tiente was called up to the Cameroon under-20 side for the first time.
