= Rodrigo Neri =

American soccer player

Personal information
- Full name: Rodrigo Antonio Neri González
- Date of birth: May 12, 2005 (age 21)
- Place of birth: Miami, Florida, United States
- Height: 6 ft 1 in (1.86 m)
- Position: Forward

Team information
- Current team: Maryland Terrapins
- Number: 9

Youth career
- Alcorcón
- 2021–2024: Atlético Madrid
- 2024: Valencia

College career
Years	Team	Apps	(Gls)
2026–	Maryland Terrapins	11	(6)

Senior career*
Years	Team	Apps	(Gls)
2024–2025	Atlanta United 2	37	(9)

International career
2022	United States U17	1	(2)
2022–	United States U19	6	(6)
2023–	United States U23	5	(1)
- * Club domestic league appearances and goals as of 21:57, October 13, 2026 (UTC)

Rodrigo Antonio Neri González (born May 12, 2005) is an American professional soccer player who plays as a forward for the Maryland Terrapins in NCAA Division I.

== Club career ==
Born in Miami, Florida, United States, Neri joined the academy of Atlético Madrid from Alcorcón in 2021.

== International career ==
Neri has represented the United States at youth international level. He is also eligible to represent Venezuela and Spain.
