= Fuad Adeniyi =

English footballer (born 1994)

Personal information
- Full name: Fuad Adedapo Adeniyi
- Date of birth: 15 November 1994 (age 32)
- Place of birth: London, England
- Height: 6 ft 0 in (1.83 m)
- Positions: Defender; forward

Youth career
- Shaftesbury
- The Football CV Academy

College career
Years	Team	Apps	(Gls)
	University of Mobile Rams	18	(2)
2015	UC Santa Barbara Gauchos	15	(0)

Senior career*
Years	Team	Apps	(Gls)
2015	FC London		
2015–2016	AFC Ann Arbor		
2016	Sporting Kristina		
2019	Dalton Red Wolves	7	(6)
2019	Atlanta SC	2	(0)
2021	Club ATLetic		
2022	South Georgia Tormenta	19	(1)
2023	Atlanta United 2	14	(0)
2024	Georgia FC	7	(0)
- * Club domestic league appearances and goals as of 16:55, 14 October 2024 (UTC)

Fuad Adepapo Adeniyi (born 15 November 1994) is an English professional footballer who plays as a defender.

== Career ==
=== Youth ===
Adeniyi played with various youth teams, including Harrow St. Mary's, Dorset RFC, Shaftesbury, and The Football CV Academy.

=== College & amateur ===
In 2012, Adeniyi moved to the United States to play college soccer at the University of Mobile. After playing with the Rams, where he earned First Team All-League honors in 2014, Adeniyi transferred to the University of California, Santa Barbara in 2015, where he made 15 appearances.

Following college, Adeniyi spent time with FC London in 2015, and later spent two seasons with AFC Ann Arbor. In late 2016, Adeniyi made the move to Finland, playing with four-tier side Sporting Kristina.

Later in 2019, Adeniyi appeared seven times for USL League Two club Dalton Red Wolves, scoring six goals and tallying a single assist. 2021 saw Adeniyi play with Atlanta-based amateur side Club ATLetic of the ADASL.

=== Professional ===
In 2019, Adeniyi made two regular-season appearances in the NISA with Atlanta SC. On 8 June 2022, Adeniyi signed with USL League One club . In 2024, he made 7 appearances for NISA club Georgia FC.
