= Lorenzo D'Agostini =

American soccer player (born 2005)

Personal information
- Date of birth: September 21, 2005 (age 21)
- Place of birth: Miami, Florida, United States
- Height: 1.77 m (5 ft 10 in)
- Position: Striker

Team information
- Current team: Lazio Primavera
- Number: 10

Youth career
- 2023–: Lazio

Senior career*
Years	Team	Apps	(Gls)
2023	Inter Miami II	14	(3)
2025	→ Rimini (loan)	10	(0)
- * Club domestic league appearances and goals as of November 4, 2025

Lorenzo D'Agostini (born September 21, 2005) is an American soccer player who plays as a striker for Campionato Primavera 1 side Lazio.

== Early life ==
D'Agostini has regarded France international Zinedine Zidane as his soccer idol.

== Club career ==
As a youth player, D'Agostini joined the youth academy of Italian Serie A side Lazio.

== International career ==
On June 3, 2024, D'Agostini was called up to the Venezuela national under-20 team.

== Style of play ==
D'Agostini mainly operates as a striker and has been described as "valid striker in the penalty area and very good at movements without the ball, so much so that he is able to move opponents bigger than him thanks to a tactical knowledge that is uncommon in a young striker".

== Personal life ==
D'Agostini is the twin brother of American soccer player Stefan D'Agostini. He was born to Venezuelan parents.
