= Yostin Salinas =

Costa Rican football player (born 1998)

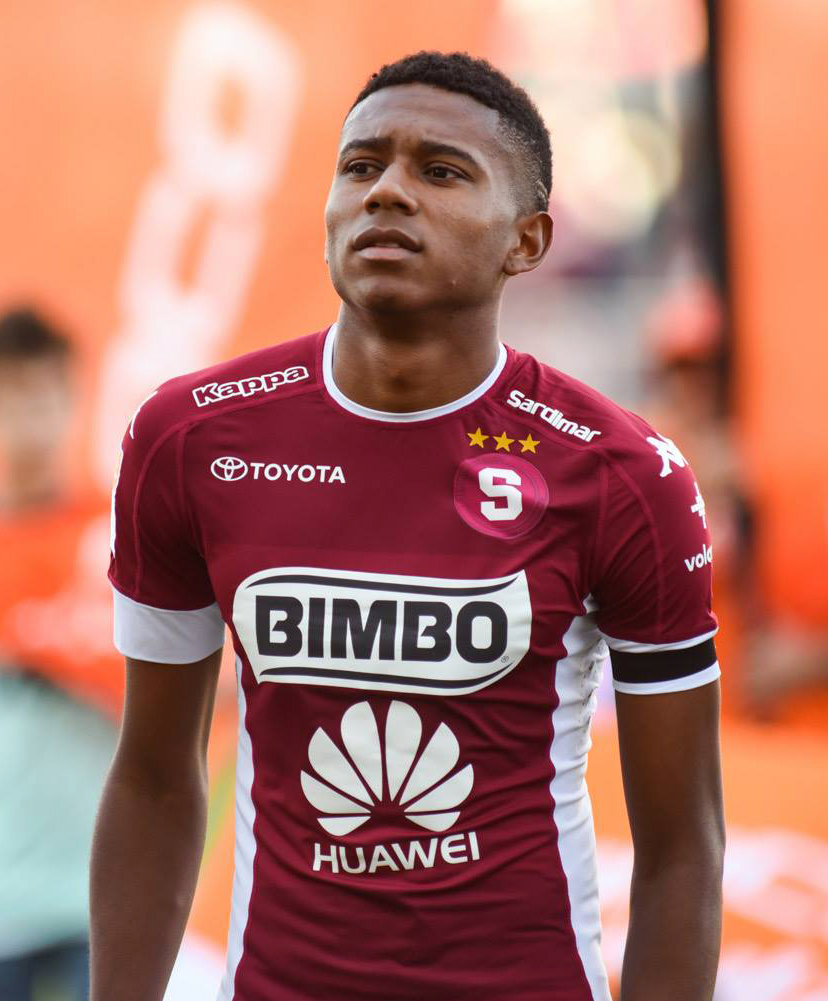
- Salinas with Saprissa in 2017

Personal information
- Full name: Yostin Jafet Salinas Phillips
- Date of birth: 14 September 1998 (age 28)
- Place of birth: Limón, Costa Rica
- Height: 1.84 m (6 ft 0 in)
- Position: Right back

Team information
- Current team: Sporting San José

Youth career
- Limón

Senior career*
Years	Team	Apps	(Gls)
2016–2017	Limón	29	(0)
2017–2020	Saprissa	76	(1)
2020–	Sporting San José	107	(8)
2022	→ New York Red Bulls II (loan)	14	(0)

International career^{‡}
2018–	Costa Rica	4	(0)
- * Club domestic league appearances and goals as of 23:12, 28 December 2025 (UTC) ‡ National team caps and goals as of 23:12, 14 November 2024 (UTC)

Yostin Salinas (born 14 September 1998) is a Costa Rican professional footballer who plays for Sporting San José.

== Club career ==
=== Limón ===
Born in Limón, Salinas started his football career at local club Limón. Salinas was trained in the youth categories of the club, and shortly after he won his promotion to the main squad during the 2015–16 season. Under the direction of Horacio Esquivel, Yostin made his debut, at just 16 years old, on 9 August 2015, in matchday 2 against Universidad de Costa Rica, at the Ecological Stadium. On that occasion, he entered the match for Alvin Bennett in the 90th minute in a 0–1 victory. On 16 August 2015, he started for the first time and saw action for 62 minutes in a scoreless draw against Municipal Liberia.

=== Saprissa ===
On 20 December 2016, Deportivo Saprissa announced, through a press release, the signing of Salinas by the purple team. The footballer signed a three-year contract. Salinas made his league debut for his new club on 8 January 2017, as Saprissa visited the Estadio Carlos Ugalde Álvarez, where they faced San Carlos. Salinas made his official debut with the number «2», received a yellow card in the 2nd minute of the match, two minutes later he was cautioned and consequently expelled, in a 1–0 loss.

In the first leg of the league final on 15 May 2018 against Herediano in the Estadio Rosabal Cordero, Salinas scored his first goal in the top flight in the 79th minute, on a shot from outside the area with his left foot to save his club from defeat, in a 1–1 draw. On 20 May, Salinas and his club claimed the league title as they beat Herediano in the penalty shootout.

=== Sporting San José ===
In July 2020, Salinas moved to Sporting San José on loan from Saprissa. on 25 May 2021, Salinas opened the scoring for San José in a 2–2 draw with his boyhood club Limón. The result guaranteed his club remained in the top flight. He ended his season at the club appearing in 23 matches and scoring one goal.

During June 2020, after his loan with San José ended, Salinas returned to Saprissa. In his second spell with the club Salinas appeared in 8 matches. After being seldom used by Saprissa during the 2020 season, Salinas returned to San José on 24 December 2021. Salinas quickly integrated into the squad and into the starting lineup. On 31 March 2022, Salinas opened the scoring for San José in a 4–0 victory over San Carlos.

==== loan to New York Red Bull II ====
On 8 August 2022, it was announced that Salinas was joining New York Red Bulls II on loan from Sporting San José .

== International career ==
He made his debut for the Costa Rica national football team on 17 November 2018 against Chile at Estadio El Teniente.

== Career statistics ==
=== International ===
As of match played 14 November 2024

Appearances and goals by national team and year
National team	Year	Apps	Goals
Costa Rica	2018	2	0
Costa Rica	2020	1	0
Costa Rica	2024	1	0
Total		4	0
