= Patrick Weah =

Liberian footballer (born 2003)

Personal information
- Date of birth: 15 December 2003 (age 22)
- Place of birth: Monrovia, Liberia
- Height: 6 ft 1 in (1.85 m)
- Position: Forward

Team information
- Current team: Atlanta United 2
- Number: 33

Youth career
- Minnesota United

College career
Years	Team	Apps	(Gls)
2020–2021	Saint Louis Billikens	3	(1)

Senior career*
Years	Team	Apps	(Gls)
2021–2024	Minnesota United 2	20	(10)
2021–2024	Minnesota United	5	(0)
2021	→ Sacramento Republic (loan)	7	(0)
2023	→ FC Tulsa (loan)	5	(0)
2024	→ HB Køge (loan)	3	(0)
2025–	Atlanta United 2	37	(11)
2025	Atlanta United	1	(0)
- * Club domestic league appearances and goals as of September 13, 2026

Patrick Weah (born 15 December 2003) is a Liberian professional footballer who plays as a forward for Atlanta United 2.

== Club career ==
Born in Monrovia, Liberia, Weah moved with his parents to Maple Grove, Minnesota, where he played high school soccer at Wayzata High School. While at Wayzata, Weah was part of the side that ended as the state runners-up before helping his school win the state championship during his sophomore season. At the end of his championship season, Weah was named as the Minnesota State Player of the Year. Following his two seasons with this school team, Weah joined the youth academy at Minnesota United.

In June 2020, it was announced that Weah would play college soccer with the Saint Louis Billikens. He made his collegiate debut for the Billikens on 3 February 2021 against the Kansas City Roos, scoring in the 53rd minute of a 3–0 victory.

=== Minnesota United ===
On 4 March 2021, Weah returned to Major League Soccer club Minnesota United and signed as a homegrown player. He made his professional debut for the club on 1 May 2021 against Austin FC, coming on as an 81st-minute substitute during the 0–1 defeat.

==== Loan to Sacramento Republic ====
On 17 September 2021, USL Championship club Sacramento Republic announced they have acquired Weah on loan from Minnesota United for the remainder of the 2021 season.

== International career ==
On 2 October 2021, he accepted a call-up from Liberia for two World Cup qualifiers against Cape Verde.

== Honors ==
Individual

- Minnesota State Player of the Year: 2017
