= Alan Carleton =

American soccer player (born 2005)

Personal information
- Date of birth: 20 March 2005 (age 21)
- Place of birth: Powder Springs, Georgia, United States
- Height: 1.72 m (5 ft 8 in)
- Positions: Midfielder; winger

Team information
- Current team: Sandvikens IF
- Number: 12

Youth career
- Atlanta United FC

Senior career*
Years	Team	Apps	(Gls)
2022–2024	Atlanta United 2	56	(3)
2023–2024	Atlanta United FC	0	(0)
2025	Huntsville City FC	25	(12)
2025	Nashville SC	2	(0)
2026–	Sandvikens IF	24	(4)

International career^{‡}
2026–	United States U21	1	(0)
- * Club domestic league appearances and goals as of 12 November 2026 ‡ National team caps and goals as of 27 March 2026

Alan Carleton (born 20 March 2005) is an American professional soccer player who plays as a midfielder or winger for Sandvikens IF.

== Early life ==
Carleton was born on 20 March 2005 and is the younger brother of American soccer player Andrew Carleton. Born in Powder Springs, Georgia, United States, he is a native of Metro Atlanta, United States.

== Club career ==
As a youth player, Carleton joined the youth academy of Atlanta United FC and was promoted to the club's reserve team in 2022, where he made fifty-six league appearances and scored three goals. On 2 April 2022, he debuted for them during a 2–1 away win over Hartford Athletic in the league.

Ahead of the 2026 season, he signed for Swedish side Sandvikens IF. On 22 June 2026, he scored his first goal for the club during a 1–1 away draw with Örebro SK in the league.

== International career ==
Carleton is a United States youth international and has represented the country internationally at under-21 level.

On 27 March 2026, he debuted for the United States men's national under-21 soccer team during a 2–0 away friendly win over the Japan national under-21 football team.

== Style of play ==
Carleton plays as a midfielder or winger and is right-footed. American news website SixOneFive Soccer wrote in 2026 that "he is electric in transition, pushing the game forward and punishing defenders one-on-one. He is an excellent creator for his teammates and really smart in the box, being at the right place at the right time to score".
