= Turner Soccer Complex =

Stadium in Athens, Georgia, US

Coordinates: 33°54′39″N 83°22′47″W

- Interactive map of Turner Soccer Complex
- Address: 2330 S Milledge Ave. Athens, Georgia; United States
- Owner: University of Georgia
- Operator: Univ. of Georgia Athletics
- Capacity: 1,682
- Type: Stadium

Construction
- Opened: 1998; 28 years ago

Tenants
- Georgia Bulldogs (NCAA) teams: women's soccer; softball

Website
- georgiadogs.com/turner-soccer-complex

Turner Soccer Complex is a 1,682-capacity stadium located in Athens, Georgia. It serves as the home field for the Georgia Bulldogs women's soccer and softball teams.

== History ==
The complex is named for Hoyt "Jack" Turner, an Athens native and former University of Georgia baseball and basketball player who financially supported the Bulldogs soccer program.

The stadium opened on September 1, 1998 (27 years ago), when Georgia hosted Mercer, winning 1–0. Turner Soccer Complex hosted the 2000 Southeastern Conference women's soccer tournament.
