= Nicolas Firmino =

Brazilian footballer (born 2001)

Personal information
- Full name: Elio Nicolas Firmino
- Date of birth: 30 January 2001 (age 25)
- Place of birth: Mantena, Brazil
- Height: 1.80 m (5 ft 11 in)
- Position: Midfielder

Team information
- Current team: Lexington SC
- Number: 8

Youth career
- 2014–2018: New England Revolution

Senior career*
Years	Team	Apps	(Gls)
2018–2020	New England Revolution	0	(0)
2019	→ Hartford Athletic (loan)	0	(0)
2020	New England Revolution II	16	(4)
2021	Union Omaha	24	(2)
2022–2024	Atlanta United 2	81	(22)
2023–2024	→ Atlanta United (loan)	3	(1)
2022–2024	Atlanta United	5	(0)
2023–2024	→ Atlanta United 2 (loan)	19	(3)
2025–	Lexington SC	59	(11)
- * Club domestic league appearances and goals as of 11:24, 9 November 2026 (UTC)

Elio Nicolas Firmino de Araujo (born 30 January 2001), known as Nick Firmino, is a Brazilian footballer who plays as a midfielder for USL Championship club Lexington SC.

== Career ==
=== New England Revolution ===
In November 2018, Firmino signed a Homegrown Player Contract with the New England Revolution.

Firmino was loaned to the team's USL League One side New England Revolution II for the 2020 season. He made his pro debut on July 25, 2020 against Union Omaha, playing the full game. He scored his first professional goal on August 15 in a 3-3 draw with North Texas SC.

Following the 2020 season, New England opted to release Firmino.

=== Union Omaha ===
In April 2021, Firmino joined USL League One side Union Omaha ahead of the 2021 season.

=== Atlanta United 2 ===
On 3 March 2022, Firmino moved to USL Championship side Atlanta United 2. On March 23, 2023, Firmino signed a short-team deal with Atlanta United FC ahead of their MLS fixture with Columbus Crew. On June 21, 2023, Firmino was signed to a short-term deal with Atlanta United FC ahead of their match with New York City FC. Firmino would make his MLS debut when he was subbed on in the 87th minute. He would go on to score in the 90+5' to pull Atlanta United FC level in the match that would end in a 2-2 draw.

=== Lexington SC ===
On 6 January 2025, Firmino joined Lexington SC ahead of the club's first season competing in the USL Championship.
