= Kofi Twumasi =

Ghanaian footballer (born 1996)

Personal information
- Date of birth: 30 August 1996 (age 30)
- Place of birth: Kumasi, Ghana
- Height: 1.80 m (5 ft 11 in)
- Position: Midfielder

Team information
- Current team: El Paso Locomotive
- Number: 21

Youth career
- 2014: Kalonji Soccer Academy

Senior career*
Years	Team	Apps	(Gls)
2017–2019	Viitorul Constanța	1	(0)
2018–2019	→ Universitatea Cluj (loan)	12	(2)
2019–2021	Rot-Weiß Oberhausen	17	(0)
2021–2022	VfB Homberg	13	(0)
2023	Atlanta United 2	27	(1)
2024	Rhode Island FC	10	(0)
2025–	El Paso Locomotive	44	(0)
- * Club domestic league appearances and goals as of 21:06, 8 November 2026 (UTC)

Kofi Twumasi (born 30 August 1996) is a Ghanaian professional footballer who plays as a midfielder for USL Championship side El Paso Locomotive. He is the brother of Kwadwo Twumasi who also played in Romania at Farul Constanța.
