= Erik Centeno =

American soccer player

Personal information
- Full name: Erik Daniel Centeno
- Date of birth: June 29, 2002 (age 24)
- Place of birth: Stockton, California, United States
- Height: 5 ft 8 in (1.73 m)
- Positions: Winger; right-back

Youth career
- 2015–2018: Sacramento Republic
- 2019–2020: FC Dallas
- 2021: Sacramento Republic

College career
Years	Team	Apps	(Gls)
2021	Pacific Tigers	16	(6)

Senior career*
Years	Team	Apps	(Gls)
2022–2024	Atlanta United	0	(0)
2022–2024	Atlanta United 2	76	(1)
2025	Birmingham Legion	13	(0)
- * Club domestic league appearances and goals as of October 25, 2025

Erik Daniel Centeno (born June 29, 2002) is an American professional soccer player who plays as a right-back.

== Career ==
=== Youth and college ===
Centeno attended high school soccer at Weston Ranch High School, also playing club soccer for Sacramento Republic from 2015 to 2019, before moving to the FC Dallas academy. He returned to Sacramento Republic in 2021, signing a USL academy contract with the team, but didn't make a first-team appearance.

In 2021, Centeno attended University of the Pacific to play college soccer. He went on to make 16 appearances in his freshman season, scoring six goals and tallying five assists for the Tigers, garnering first-team All-West Coast Conference and the conference's Freshman of the Year honors after leading the Tigers in points and tying for the team lead in goals. In January 2022, it was announced Centeno would leave college early and had signed a Generation Adidas contract to enter the 2022 MLS SuperDraft.

=== Professional ===
On January 11, 2022, Centeno was selected 19th overall in the 2022 MLS SuperDraft by Atlanta United. On February 25, 2022, it was announced Centeno would spend time with Atlanta United 2, the club's USL Championship team. He made his professional debut on March 12, 2022, starting against Louisville City.

On May 23, 2025, Centeno signed with USL Championship side Birmingham Legion. He was released by Birmingham following their 2025 season.

== Personal life ==
Born in the United States, Centeno is of Mexican descent.
