= Karim Tmimi =

France association football player (born 1996)

Personal information
- Full name: Karim Tmimi
- Date of birth: 8 August 1996 (age 30)
- Place of birth: Poitiers, France
- Height: 5 ft 10 in (1.78 m)
- Position: Forward

Youth career
- –2016: Stade Poitevin

College career
| Years | Team | Apps | (Gls) |
| 2020–2022 | Georgia Gwinnett Grizzlies | 47 | (36) |

Senior career*
| Years | Team | Apps | (Gls) |
| 2018–2020 | Chauvigny | 25 | (2) |
| 2022 | Georgia Revolution | 1 | (1) |
| 2023–2024 | Atlanta United 2 | 52 | (15) |
- * Club domestic league appearances and goals as of 22:44, 11 December 2024 (UTC) ‡ National team caps and goals as of 18:09, 28 March 2023 (UTC)

Karim Tmimi (born 8 August 1996) is a French professional footballer who plays as a forward.

== Early life and college career ==
Born in Poitiers, France, Tmimi played for his local academy team Stade Poitevin throughout his youth years. From 2018 to 2020 he played with fifth tier French side US Chauvigny, before moving to the United States to attend Georgia Gwinnett College to play for the Men's soccer team at age 23.

In 3 seasons, Tmimi appeared in 47 matches scoring an impressive 36 goals, earning him an All-American honours in 2022.

== Club career ==
On 13 January 2021, Tmimi signed a professional contract with Atlanta United 2. He made his professional debut on 27 March 2023 against New England Revolution II, coming on as a substitute. As of July 2026, he is playing for Kalonji Pro-Profile in the UPSL.
