= Jhon Solís (footballer, born 1999) =

Colombian footballer (born 1999)

Personal information
- Full name: Jhon Jairo Solís Vélez
- Date of birth: 12 February 1999 (age 27)
- Place of birth: San José del Guaviare, Colombia
- Height: 1.72 m (5 ft 8 in)
- Positions: Midfielder; winger

Team information
- Current team: Fortaleza
- Number: 30

Youth career
- Alianza Llanos
- VyV Mi nuevo Tolima
- 2017–2018: Boca Juniors
- 2018–2020: Deportes Tolima

Senior career*
Years	Team	Apps	(Gls)
2020	Deportes Tolima	0	(0)
2020	→ Bogotá (loan)	2	(0)
2021–2022	Fortaleza CEIF	77	(10)
2023–2025	Orlando City B	68	(8)
2025–	Fortaleza (Note: Fortaleza changed their name from Fortaleza C.E.I.F. to Fortaleza F.C. in 2026)	15	(1)
- * Club domestic league appearances and goals as of 04:09, 10 November 2026 (UTC)

Jhon Jairo Solís Vélez (born 12 February 1999) is a Colombian professional footballer who plays as a midfielder for Categoría Primera A club Fortaleza.

== Club career ==
Born in San José del Guaviare, capital of the Guaviare Department of Colombia, Solís began his footballing career with Alianza Llanos in Villavicencio. He played for a couple of clubs in Bogotá, as well as Ibagué-based VyV (Vargas y Virviescas) Mi nuevo Tolima, also representing the Tolima Department in the National Championship, before moving to Argentina to join Boca Juniors. Shortly after arriving at the Buenos Aires-based club, he was invited to train with the first team.

After a year and a half with Boca Juniors, he returned to Colombia, signing with Deportes Tolima. He featured for the club in a 0–0 friendly draw with Atlético Huila in January 2019, but would not play for the club in official competitions. In February 2020, he was loaned to Categoría Primera B side Bogotá for six months. He finished the 2020 campaign with two league appearances, before returning to Deportes Tolima.

He spent the next two seasons in the Colombian second division with Fortaleza CEIF, establishing himself as a first team player by the end of the 2021 season.

Following his release by Fortaleza CEIF, he moved to the United States, joining MLS Next Pro side Orlando City B, and went on to make his debut in the opening game of the season: a 3–1 away win against Philadelphia Union II.

On 6 June 2025, Solís scored a free kick goal against Huntsville City, helping the game end in a 3–2 victory. Five days later, Solís' goal won him the goal of the matchweek.

On 15 July 2025, Solís returned to Fortaleza CEIF, which now played in the Categoría Primera A. Solís made his first appearance with Fortaleza after his return when he substituted on as a 69th-minute substitute for Kelvin Flórez. Solís scored his first goal for Fortaleza since his return to the club when he opened the score in a 1–1 draw with Alianza on 26 July 2026.

== Career statistics ==
=== Club ===
As of 6 November 2026

Appearances and goals by club, season and competition
Club	Season	League			National cup (Note: Includes Copa Colombia)		Other		Total	
Club	Season	Division	Apps	Goals	Apps	Goals	Apps	Goals	Apps	Goals
Deportes Tolima	2020	Categoría Primera A	0	0	0	0	0	0	0	0
Bogotá (loan)	2020	Categoría Primera B	2	0	1	0	0	0	3	0
Fortaleza CEIF	2021	Categoría Primera B	36	6	2	0	0	0	38	6
Fortaleza CEIF	2022	Categoría Primera B	41	4	9	2	0	0	50	6
Fortaleza CEIF	Total		77	10	11	2	0	0	88	12
Orlando City B	2023	MLS Next Pro	27	2	—		1 (Note: Appearances in MLS Next Pro playoffs)	0	28	2
Orlando City B	2024	MLS Next Pro	28	4	—		1	0	29	4
Orlando City B	2025	MLS Next Pro	13	2	—		—		13	2
Orlando City B	Total		68	8	0	0	2	0	70	8
Fortaleza CEIF	2025	Categoría Primera A	4	0	1	0	—		5	0
Fortaleza CEIF	2026	Categoría Primera A	11	1	1	0	—		12	1
Fortaleza CEIF	Total		15	1	2	0	0	0	17	1
Career total			162	19	13	0	2	0	179	21
