= Atlanta United 2 =

Soccer team

- Full name: Atlanta United 2
- Founded: November 14, 2017; 8 years ago
- Stadium: Fifth Third Bank Stadium; Kennesaw, Georgia
- Capacity: 8,318
- Owner: Arthur Blank
- President of Soccer: Mauricio Culebro
- Head coach: Jose Silva Caparros
- League: MLS Next Pro
- 2025: 10th, Eastern Conference; Playoffs: DNQ
- Website: atlutd.com/2
Home colors	Away colors

Atlanta United 2 are the reserve team of the Major League Soccer club Atlanta United FC. The team plays in MLS Next Pro, the official reserve league of MLS. The team was established on November 14, 2017 and began their first professional season in March 2018.

== History ==
In November 2017, the USL, a Division II sanctioned league by the United States Soccer Federation (USSF), announced that Major League Soccer's Atlanta United had acquired a USL affiliate team and would begin play in the 2018 season. On January 9, 2018, the team name was revealed as Atlanta United 2.

=== MLS Next Pro ===
MLS announced that it would be one of the next eight teams to join MLS Next Pro in 2023.

== Stadium ==
The team played their inaugural season at Coolray Field in Lawrenceville, Georgia, with a capacity of 7,362 for soccer games. Coolray Field is a Triple-A baseball stadium originally built in 2008 for the Gwinnett Stripers, the Atlanta Braves Triple-A affiliate. The stadium was fitted for semi-professional soccer in a standard baseball to soccer pitch configuration. The premium boxes and all stadium areas were available for soccer games, and the field was the same standard length at 70 by 110 yards (64 m × 101 m).

Atlanta United 2 announced, on December 14, 2018, that they would play their 2019 home matches at Fifth Third Bank Stadium in Kennesaw, Georgia. For the 2026 season, Atlanta United 2 will play at least 8 home matches at the Turner Soccer Complex in Athens, Georgia.

== Players and staff ==
=== Roster ===
As of September 20, 2026

Note: Flags indicate national team as defined under FIFA eligibility rules; some limited exceptions apply. Players may hold more than one non-FIFA nationality.

No.	Pos.	Nation	Player
31	FW	BRA	Caio
33	FW	LBR	Patrick Weah
39	FW	USA	Arif Kovač
41	DF	UGA	Toto Majub
44	DF	USA	Daniel Chica
51	GK	CAN	Jonathan Ransom
56	MF	USA	Ignacio Suarez

No.	Pos.	Nation	Player
60	GK	USA	James Donaldson
64	DF	MLI	Mohamed Cisset
67	MF	TOG	Enzo Dovlo
70	MF	USA	Cameron Dunbar
78	MF	USA	Andrew Jardines
81	MF	ESA	David Sibrian
82	DF	USA	Matthew Senanou

Signed to first team contract with Atlanta United.
Atlanta United Academy player.

=== Out on loan ===
Note: Flags indicate national team as defined under FIFA eligibility rules; some limited exceptions apply. Players may hold more than one non-FIFA nationality.

No.	Pos.	Nation	Player
38	FW	GUY	Liam Butts (on loan to Loudoun United)

=== Technical staff ===
Role	Name	Nation
Head coach	José Silva	Spain
Assistant coach	Will Bates	United States
Goalkeeper coach	Lewis Sharpe	England

== Year-by-year ==
As of October 17, 2026

Season	USL Championship								Playoffs	Top scorer		Head coach	Team captain(s)
Season	P	W	L	D	GF	GA	Pts	Pos	Playoffs	Player	Goals	Head coach	Team captain(s)
2018	34	7	17	10	37	72	31	14th, Eastern	DNQ	(Republic of Ireland) Jon Gallagher	6	(United States) Scott Donnelly	(England) Jack Metcalf
2019	34	9	17	8	45	77	35	14th, Eastern	DNQ	(Burundi) Bienvenue Kanakimana	7	(Scotland) Stephen Glass	(England) Jack Metcalf
2020	16	3	10	3	23	33	12	4th, Group H	DNQ	(United States) Jackson Conway (Senegal) Amadou Macky Diop	6	(Scotland) Stephen Glass (England) Tony Annan	(The Gambia) Modou Jadama
2021	32	8	14	10	46	56	34	7th, Central	DNQ	(United States) Aiden McFadden	8	(England) Tony Annan (Wales) Jack Collison	(France) Bradley Kamdem
2022	34	6	23	5	39	85	23	13th, Eastern	DNQ	(United States) Jackson Conway	11	(Wales) Jack Collison	(Trinidad and Tobago) Jay Fortune
Season	MLS Next Pro								Playoffs	Top scorer		Head coach	Team captain(s)
Season	P	W	L	D	GF	GA	Pts	Pos	Playoffs	Player	Goals	Head coach	Team captain(s)
2023	28	9	13	6	50	52	35	10th, Eastern	DNQ	(Brazil) Nicolas Firmino	16	(England) Steve Cooke	(Ghana) Kofi Twumasi
2024	28	7	13	7	42	64	32	13th, Eastern	DNQ	(France) Karim Tmimi	9	(England) Steve Cooke	(Spain) Javier Armas
2025	28	9	10	9	44	43	35	10th, Eastern	DNQ	(Liberia) Patrick Weah	9	(England) Steve Cooke (Spain) Jose Silva Caparros	(Spain) Javier Armas
2026	28	14	9	5	62	46	48	3rd, Eastern	Conference Quarterfinals	(United States) Arif Kovac	20	(Spain) Jose Silva Caparros	(United States) Matthew Senanou

== Statistics ==
=== Most appearances ===
As of September 20, 2026

#	Pos.	Name	Nation	Career	USL	MLSNP	Playoffs	Total
1	Forward	Jackson Conway	United States	2018–2023	74	14	—	88
2	Midfielder	Nicolas Firmino	Brazil	2022–2024	34	47	—	81
3	Midfielder	Erik Centeno	United States	2022–2024	30	46	—	76
4	Midfielder	Luke Brennan	United States	2022–2026	28	46	—	74
4	Defender	Efrain Morales	Bolivia	2020–2025	34	40	—	74

=== Most goals ===
As of September 20, 2026

#	Pos.	Name	Nation	Career	USL	MLSNP	Playoffs	Total
1	Forward	Jackson Conway	United States	2018–2023	23	5	—	28
2	Midfielder	Nicolas Firmino	Brazil	2022–2024	3	19	—	22
3	Forward	Arif Kovač	United States	2025–	—	20	0	20
4	Forward	Karim Tmimi	France	2023–2024	—	15	—	15
5	Midfielder	Luke Brennan	United States	2022–2026	2	11	—	13
