= Adam Arthur =

English footballer

Personal information
- Full name: Adam Joseph Arthur
- Date of birth: 27 October 1985 (age 40)
- Place of birth: Nottingham, England
- Height: 5 ft 10 in (1.78 m)
- Position: Midfielder

Team information
- Current team: West Virginia Chaos
- Number: 10

Youth career
- ?–2003: York City
- 2008–2009: Lander Bearcats

Senior career*
Years	Team	Apps	(Gls)
2003–2006	York City	4	(0)
2006–2008	Ossett Town		
2008–2009	West Virginia Chaos	21	(4)
2010–2011	Selby Town		
2011–	West Virginia Chaos	27	(4)
- * Club domestic league appearances and goals as of 9 August 2014

Adam Joseph Arthur (born 27 October 1985) is an English footballer who plays for West Virginia Chaos in the USL Premier Development League.

== Career ==
Arthur played for York City and Ossett Town. He played two games for York as a trainee in their final season in Football League Two prior to their relegation to the Football Conference, before moving to Ossett in the Northern Premier League.

Arthur moved to the United States in 2007 to play college soccer at perennial top 15 program Lander University, where he was an NSCAA Division II All-American. During his college years he also played for two seasons with West Virginia Chaos in the USL Premier Development League.

Following the conclusion of his college career, Arthur returned to the UK, playing for Selby Town in the Northern Counties East Football League in the 2010–11 season. He returned to the United States in 2011, again playing for West Virginia Chaos.
