= Unity College, Burnley =

Secondary school in Lancashire, England

Unity College
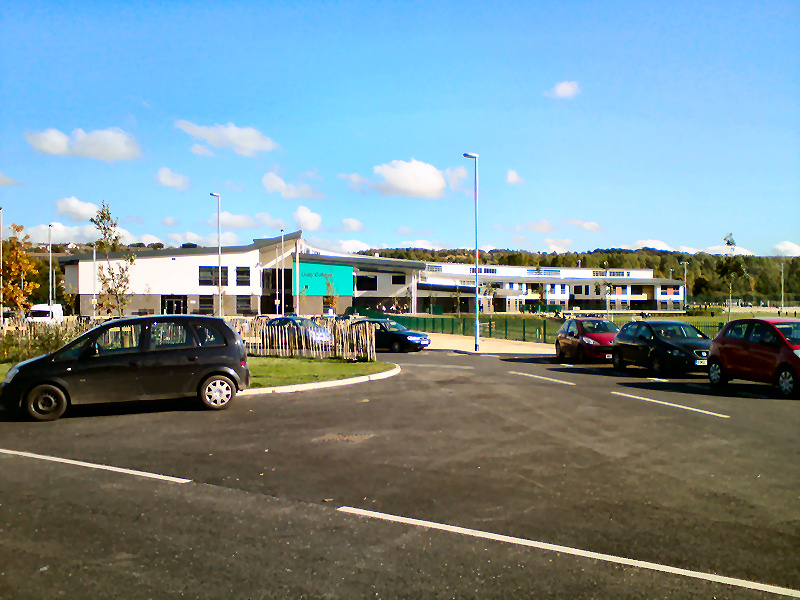

Location
- Towneley Holmes; Burnley, Lancashire, BB11 3EN; England; 53.783°N 2.221°W

Information
- Type: Foundation school
- Motto: Unity, Passion, Respect
- Established: 2006
- Local authority: Lancashire
- Department for Education URN: 135003 Tables
- Ofsted: Reports
- Chair of Governors: A. Kelly
- Head teacher: Jane Richardson
- Gender: Co-educational
- Age: 11 to 16
- Enrolment: 1299
- Capacity: 1200
- Colour: purple
- Website: https://www.unity-college.com/

Unity College is a mixed 11-16 comprehensive school in Burnley, Lancashire, England.

== History ==
=== Former school ===
Towneley High School originally opened in 1941. During its history it had been a technical school, an all-boys school, and latterly a mixed 11-16 community school. It was the first Lancashire school to be awarded by Investors in People.

=== Early history ===
The college initially occupied the former Towneley High School, but moved to a state of the art new £33m building in September 2010 as part of the Building Schools for the Future programme. The school was named by a local pupil, Heather Ashworth, who won a competition launched by the local radio station 2BR. The new school's first head teacher, Sally Cryer, had previously been head at Towneley. The school is located in Towneley Park, and the county council's decision to site the new building, on playing-fields close to the old school, rather than reusing the existing site, was contentious owing to flooding concerns. Despite plans to turn the old site into parkland, objections from local residents prompted the borough council's refusal to sell the land, triggering a 2007 public inquiry that subsequently backed the plans. The former school gate posts now serve as a feature in the park.

The 20 January 2011 edition of Question Time was broadcast from Unity College, with some pupils in the audience.

== Attainment ==
Pupils with equivalent of 5 or more GCSEs grade C or above (inc. English & Maths)
Year (Source)	Students	% special educational needs	England %	School %
2004* (BBC)	155	34.2	42.7	19.0
2005* (BBC)	143	7.7	44.9	20.0
2006	-	-	-	-
2007 (BBC)	151	15.9	46.7	21.0
2008 (BBC)	149	20.8	47.6	19.0
2009 (BBC)	161	14.2	49.8	29.0
2010 (DfE)	169	14.8	53.4	36.0
2011 (DfE)	185	8.0	58.9	39.0
2012 (DfE)	194	11.0	59.4	55.0
2013 (DfE)	200	3.0	59.2	51.0
2014 (DfE)	180	3.0	53.4	42.0
2015 (DfE)	187	3.0	53.8	38.0
*Figures for previous school, in this case: Towneley High School

In 2007, the school's value-added measure was 971 (national average 1000), which placed it in the bottom 5% nationally for adding value between the end of Key Stage 2 and the end of Key Stage 4. In 2009 the college had increased its attainment to 29% 5 A*-C passes including English and Maths. The college has also improved its 5A*-C measure from below 30% to 64% in just three years.

== Notable former pupils ==
- Ross Sykes, professional footballer
- Luke Jordan, English footballer

=== Towneley High School ===
- Dr Christine Braddock DBE, Chief Executive of Birmingham Metropolitan College and High Sheriff of the West Midlands (2013–14).
- Alice (Anne) Nutter, Chumbawamba musician and writer.
- David Readman, singer.
- Stella Reid, TV nanny.
