= Tsst =

- South Park episode
- Episode no.: Season 10; Episode 7
- Directed by: Trey Parker
- Written by: Trey Parker
- Production code: 1007
- Original air date: May 3, 2006

Episode chronology
← Previous "ManBearPig"	Next → "Make Love, Not Warcraft"
- South Park season 10

"Tsst" is the seventh episode in the tenth season of the American animated television series South Park. The 146th episode of the series overall, it originally aired on Comedy Central in the United States on May 3, 2006. In the episode, Liane Cartman has problems controlling her son Eric Cartman, and enlists several reality television shows to help with his spoiled behavior.

== Plot ==
Mentally deranged Eric Cartman and his mother, Liane, are summoned to school counselor Mr. Mackey, in regard to Cartman forcing a student into a Saw-esque situation for mocking his weight by handcuffing his leg to a flagpole and telling him that he had poisoned his lunch milk and that the only way he could get to the antidote would be to saw through his leg using a hacksaw, which kills them. Liane admits that she cannot control Cartman anymore due to his severe and untreated behaviour disorder, taking Mackey's suggestions, she turns to Nanny 911 and Supernanny. However, their attempts to change Cartman's behavior are unsuccessful; Cartman psychologically harasses Stella Reid about her decision to not have children when she takes away his Xbox, and Jo Frost, having been driven insane by Cartman’s evil, ends up in a mental hospital, sobbing and eating her own excrement while shouting "It's from Hell!".

Desperate, Liane turns to Mexican Psychiatrist Cesar Millan, who is professionally known as the Dog Whisperer. Instead of treating Cartman as a human child, Millan provides dog training techniques known as ABA Therapy which prove highly effective, leaving Cartman intensely frustrated, but his condition improves. Even when Cartman runs away, none of his friends or classmates want to take him in, forcing him to return home after spending a rainy night in a dark alley. Cartman's behavior improves after a while, although he feels he cannot control his actions. As Liane enjoys her more flexible lifestyle, Cartman plots to kill his mother. When his friends, who are sick of his antics, refuse to help Cartman, he goes to kill her while she's asleep, but his inner conscience reminds him that he does not have the right to kill her, and passes out due to emotional exhaustion.

With Cartman's behaviour in check and his disorder seemingly cured, Millan returns for a final visit. Liane thanks and invites him on an outing, which he declines because he sees her as a client, not a friend. Dismayed at being turned down, Liane asks her son (who was previously her friend) to join her on the outing. After he refuses, she persuades Cartman to spend time with her, saying he can have anything he wishes; this causes Cartman’s behavioural disorder to return as the episode ends with a shot of him having an unsettling smile on his face, while ominous music is heard playing.

== Reception ==
IGN's Eric Goldman gave the episode a score of 8.0 out of 10, writing "While not among the terrific episodes that began the season, this was a very fun installment of the show, and a nice spotlight on Cartman and what it might take to finally make him obey." When asked if he was offended by his caricature on the episode, Cesar Millan stated that he thought it and the entire episode was "fantastic".

== Cultural references ==
There are numerous references to popular American reality television programs. Of the most prominent, shows such as Nanny 911 and Supernanny which are both British programs in origin are parodied extensively. Both TV show hosts Stella Reid and Jo Frost are portrayed having accentuated British accents and stereotypically bad teeth. While he reconnects his console with the TV, Cartman sings "Don't Stop Believin'" by Journey, in Latin American Version sings "La Camisa Negra" by Juanes. Unlike the "real" television shows, neither Stella's or Jo's methods of disciplining unruly children work - ultimately forcing an insulted Stella to refuse to work with Cartman, and Jo Frost being admitted to a psychiatric hospital, eating her own excrement and repeating the phrase "It's from Hell!" Also of note is that Stella mentions never having children of her own, leading to Cartman to cruelly implicate that she is either sterile or incapable of attracting a partner, despite the real life Stella Reid being both married and a mother of one. The Dog Whisperer is also featured in the episode, along with show host Cesar Millan, who, unlike most celebrities that were portrayed on the show, is shown in a more positive light. A Skeksis from The Dark Crystal can be seen as one of the nannies. The visual effect of Cartman's angel and devil subconsciousnesses during the part where he almost attempts to kill his mother in her room was a similar reference to the 1997 science-fiction film Contact. The way Cartman changes as he makes his way down the hallway is a direct reference to the 1980 body horror film Altered States.

As the episode ends, the closing shot of Cartman staring towards the viewer is a reference to the closing shot of The Omen (1976).

== Home media ==
"Tsst", along with the thirteen other episodes from South Park's tenth season, was released on a three-disc DVD set in the United States on August 21, 2007. The set includes brief audio commentaries by series co-creators Trey Parker and Matt Stone for each episode.
