= Smotherman =

Smotherman is a surname. It may refer to:

- Austin Smotherman (born 1994), American professional golfer
- Jan Smotherman (born 1953), American astronaut
- Jordan Smotherman (born 1986), American professional ice hockey player
- R. J. Smotherman (born 2005), American professional race car driver

== See also ==
- Louie Smothermon, American soccer player
