= TSST =

The initials TSST may refer to:

- "Tsst", an episode of the tenth season of South Park
- Toshiba Samsung Storage Technology
- Toxic shock syndrome toxin
- Trier Social Stress Test
