= Daniel Gibson (politician) =

American politician and attorney

Member of the South Carolina House of Representatives from the 12th district
- Incumbent
- Assumed office November 14, 2022
- Preceded by: Anne Parks
- Succeeded by: Jumelle Brooks

Personal details
- Born: Anderson, South Carolina, U.S.
- Party: Republican
- Education: Forrest College (AS)

Norman Daniel Gibson is an American politician. He is a member of the South Carolina House of Representatives from the 12th District. He is a member of the Republican party.

== Early life and career ==
Gibson was born in Anderson, South Carolina. He graduated from Forrest College, a community college in Anderson. He worked as a career pilot.

== Political career ==
In the 2022 general election, Gibson unseated Democratic incumbent Anne Parks, who held the office since 1999. He received 52.9% of the total vote. He assumed office on December 6, 2022.

Gibson serves on the House Interstate Cooperation and the Agriculture, Natural Resources and Environmental Affairs Committees.

In 2026, Gibson ran for re-election and was endorsed by the NFIB South Carolina PAC. He was defeated by Democrat Jumelle Brooks in the general election.
