= Samuel Lander =

American minister and educator (1833–1904)

The Reverend Samuel Lander
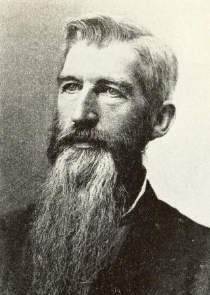
- Lander c.1873–74

1st President of Williamston Female College
- In office February 12, 1872 – July 14, 1904
- Succeeded by: John O. Willson

Personal details
- Born: January 30, 1833 Lincolnton, North Carolina, U.S.
- Died: July 14, 1904 (aged 71) Williamston, South Carolina, U.S.
- Resting place: Williamston Cemetery; Williamston, South Carolina, U.S.
- Spouse: Laura Ann McPherson (m. 1853)
- Education: Randolph–Macon College; Trinity College

Samuel Lander II (January 30, 1833 – July 14, 1904) was an American Methodist minister, educator, and academic administrator who founded Williamston Female College, now Lander University, in 1872 and was its first president. A civil engineer and surveyor early in his career, Lander soon began teaching. He joined the faculty of Catawba College in 1853 and taught at several other schools before returning to his hometown of Lincolnton, North Carolina, to found the Lincolnton Female Seminary. After becoming a Methodist minister in 1866, he got his first position in administration as president of Davenport Female College in Lenoir, North Carolina. After spending less than a year as co-president of Spartanburg Female College in Spartanburg, South Carolina, Lander relocated to Williamston, South Carolina, after being appointed to preach at a Methodist church there. In February 1872, he founded Williamston Female College with an enrollment of thirty-six students. The school grew quickly, doubling its enrollment by the end of its first academic year. Lander, who was appointed president by the South Carolina Conference of the Methodist Episcopal Church, South, ran the school with an emphasis on individual academic performance. The school relocated to Greenwood, South Carolina, starting in 1903, though Lander died the following year before the move could be completed. The school reopened as Lander College in September 1904 and still bears his name today.

== Early life and education ==
Samuel Lander II was born in Lincolnton, North Carolina, on January 30, 1833, to Elizabeth Ann Miller (1793–1875) and Rev. Samuel Lander (1792–1864). He was their seventh child and third son, though one of his older brothers, George, died in infancy twelve years before Samuel was born.

Lander enrolled at Randolph–Macon College, in Ashland, Virginia, in 1849 and graduated at the top of his class on June 10, 1852. He earned a Master's degree from Trinity College—now Duke University—in 1855.

== Career ==
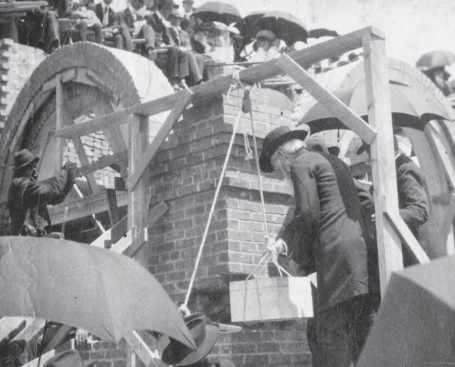
Lander placing the cornerstone from the Williamston building into the school's new Greenwood building in May 1904

After graduating, Lander spent time studying civil engineering and had a job as a surveyor. He began teaching shortly afterward, starting as a member of the Catawba College faculty in 1853. He went on to teach at the Olin Institute in Olin, North Carolina, before returning to his alma mater, Randolph–Macon College, to teach foreign languages for one year. Next, he spent three years at Greensboro Female College—now Greensboro College—in Greensboro, North Carolina. He left Greensboro to accept the presidency of the High Point Normal School in 1859.

After founding the Lincolnton Female Seminary in Lincolnton, Lander became president of Davenport Female College, which had been founded in Lenoir, North Carolina, in 1855. He remained at Davenport from 1868 to 1870, at which point he left to become co-president of Spartanburg Female College in Spartanburg, South Carolina. During his time teaching, he published three textbooks: Our Own Primary Arithmetic (1863), Our Own School Arithmetic (1863), and The Verbal Primer (1865).

Lander stayed in Spartanburg for less than a year before he was appointed by the Methodist Episcopal Church, South (MECS) to take charge of the Methodist circuit in Williamston, South Carolina. He had been licensed as a preacher on March 30, 1861, and had become a Methodist minister in 1866.

Lander arrived in Williamston in the early 1870s after being appointed as the minister at Grace Methodist Church. When he arrived, the town had no available housing, so he and his family moved to an old hotel which had been abandoned during the Civil War. He obtained special permission from the MECS to open a school in the hotel; such permission was needed because the church did not allow members of the clergy to have other sources of income. After making improvements and upgrades to the hotel and hiring personnel, Lander opened Williamston Female College there on February 12, 1872.

Lander led the school from its founding; he was officially appointed president by the MECS South Carolina Conference in 1873 and again in every succeeding year until his death. The school, which operated on a calendar of two terms of twenty weeks each, grew quickly; it began with an enrollment of thirty-six students, which had doubled by the conclusion of that academic year. The school incentivized high performance by lowering fees for those with high GPAs and assessed students' progress individually with school administration determining when each student graduated. In 1884, Lander founded the Naiad, a newsletter about the school; that same name was later given to the school's yearbook, which was published annually from 1923 to 1991.

In 1903, Lander agreed to move the college to Greenwood, South Carolina, after the city offered to construct new facilities for the school on eighteen acres (780,000 sq ft) of land. Lander also took this opportunity to grow the school by hiring more faculty members, though he did not live to see the project finish. The school opened in Greenwood for the 1904–1905 academic year in September 1904 (Note: Sources disagree as to when the school opened in Greenwood for the first time. Karen Petit's "I Am Lander 150" article (2022) notes the date as September 17, 1904, while Lander University by Mash & Wiecki (2022) and A Brief History of Lander University by Stone (2016) list the date as September 27.) under a new name, Lander College, named in honor of Samuel. He was succeeded as president by Rev. John O. Willson, his son-in-law. Willson led the school from 1904 to 1923.

== Personal life and death ==
Lander married Laura Ann McPherson on December 20, 1853, with whom he had eleven children. He died at 1:30 a.m. on July 14, 1904, in Williamston.

Lander was a polyglot and was fluent in French, Gaelic, German, Ancient Greek, Hebrew, Italian, and Latin by the time of his death. During his life, he also studied the constructed language Volapük and was able to read Portuguese and Spanish. He was awarded an honorary Doctor of Divinity degree from Trinity College in 1878.

The school still bears Lander's name after numerous changes: it became coeducational in 1943 and Greenwood County took over control of the school eight years later. It became a state-assisted college in 1973 and underwent another name change, becoming Lander University, in July 1992.

== Notes ==
Academic offices
Preceded by Office established	President of Williamston Female College; February 12, 1872 — July 14, 1904	Succeeded by John O. Willson
