= Stephen Magennis =

Irish association footballer

Personal information
- Date of birth: 1986 (age 39–40)
- Place of birth: Dublin, Ireland

College career
| Years | Team | Apps | (Gls) |
| 2005–2006 | Darton State Cavaliers | | |
| 2007–2009 | Lander Bearcats | | |

Managerial career
- 2013–2015: Lander Bearcats (assistant)
- 2016–: Georgia Gwinnett Grizzlies (assistant)
- 2017–2019: Georgia Revolution FC

Stephen Magennis is an Irish former footballer who is an assistant coach at Georgia Gwinnett College.

== Youth & education ==
A native of Dublin, Ireland, Magennis came to the U.S. on a soccer scholarship to Darton State College (NJCAA) and completed his Associate of Arts degree (2005–2007). Upon graduating, he transferred to Lander University, playing his final two years of eligibility and graduating with a Bachelor of Science degree in Exercise Science (2007–2009), followed by a master's degree in education (Exercise Science) (2012–2014).

== Career ==
Magennis signed as the head coach of the Georgia Revolution FC in 2017. Magennis came to the Revs with a wealth of experience and a vast coaching background with successful programs (currently at Georgia Gwinnett College Grizzlies). In his first year, he helped the Grizzlies to their third Association of Independent Institutions Championship Title. He then helped the program to its highest post season NAIA national ranking (No. 8) in 2017. Magennis' responsibilities include all day-to-day operations for the men's soccer program, but his specific focus is on the on-field coaching and recruiting.

Prior to GGC, Magennis spent three years coaching the Lander men's soccer program as an assistant. During his tenure, he helped guide Lander to the regular season Peach Belt Conference (PBC) Championship and secure an NCAA national tournament appearance in the round of 32 (2012). The following year, the Bearcats achieved a further NCAA sweet 16 national tournament appearance (2013). In his final year at Lander (2014), he built and headed a Junior Varsity program that competed regionally and in turn improved student enrollment for the institution. Coupled with his collegiate coaching experiences, he spent time with the New Orleans Jesters (NPSL) as their first assistant coach and director of operations (2009–2010).

Magennis holds a USSF A License, NSCAA Premier Diploma, and Football Association of Ireland Level 1 and 2 coaching certificates.
