= Jonnie Turpie =

Jonnie Turpie MBE, DL
- Born: Edward Jonathon Turpie
- Occupation: Film producer
- Known for: High Sheriff of the West Midlands (2015–2016)
- Website: wmlieutenancy.org/staff/jonnie-turpie-mbe-dl/

Edward Jonathon Turpie MBE DL is an artist and researcher following his career as a film producer and businessman. He was High Sheriff of the West Midlands from 2015 to 2016. He was the founder and director of Independent Production Company Maverick TV.

Turpie was chair of Screen West Midlands and a board member of Creative England. He was a Trustee of Birmingham MuseumsTrust. https://www.birminghammuseums.org.uk/birmingham-museum-and-art-gallery. He was chair of MAC Midlands Arts Centre https://macbirmingham.co.uk/ He is a founder member and chair of The Birmingham Ormiston Academy Group. https://www.boa-academy.co.uk/

He was made a Member of the Order of the British Empire (MBE) in the 2010 New Year's honours List, "for services to international trade".

He was awarded an honorary doctorate by Birmingham City University in 2016. He embarked upon a doctoral research project in 2017 at BCU. The PhD research subject was: The Drawn Serigraph: A Investigation Through Portraiture. He was awarded a Doctorate in July 2025. https://printsanew.jonnieturpie.com/the-final-phd .
