= Christine Braddock =

British further education administrator

Dame Christine Braddock, DBE, DL is a British further education administrator, academic and was High Sheriff of the West Midlands for the year 2013–2014. She has received three honorary degrees. She was awarded a CBE in 2007, and was then promoted to Dame Commander of the Order of the British Empire in 2013, for services to further education.

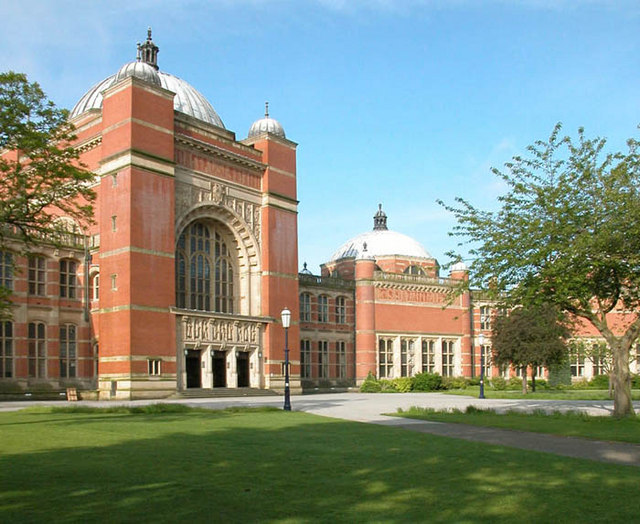
Birmingham University

== Early life ==
Christine Braddock was born in Burnley, Lancashire, where she attended Towneley High School (then Burnley Technical High School) and later went to Newcastle University. She went on to graduate from Birmingham University with a BPhilEd in Education in 1989.

== Career ==
Braddock was chairman of Birmingham Children’s Hospital NHS Foundation Trust and Birmingham Women's Hospital.

Until 2014 she was the Principal and Chief Executive of Birmingham Metropolitan College. She previously ran prison education for the Home Office in the Midlands.

Braddock was appointed as the new chairman of Birmingham Children's Hospital beginning in 2015. She is a past President of the Birmingham Chamber of Commerce and was the first public sector representative in its history to be nominated for the Presidency.

== Appointments ==
She was appointed High Sheriff of the West Midlands in March 2013. She was awarded an honorary DUniv degree by Birmingham University in 2013. She has also received honorary degrees from Aston University and Birmingham City University.

== Honours ==
Braddock was appointed a Dame Commander of the Order of the British Empire (DBE) for services to Further Education in the 2013 New Year Honours. She had formerly been appointed a Commander of the Order of the British Empire (CBE) in 2007.
