= Louie Smothermon =

American soccer player and coach

Louie Smotherman
Personal information
- Place of birth: Vietnam
- Height: 5 ft 9 in (1.75 m)

Youth career
- 1988–1991: Lander Bearcats

Senior career*
Years	Team	Apps	(Gls)
–1996	South Carolina Shamrocks		
1997–1999	New Orleans Storm	35	(2)

Managerial career
- 1998–1999: New Orleans Storm (assistant)
- * Club domestic league appearances and goals

Louie Smotherman is a retired American soccer player who played professionally in the USISL A-League.

Smotherman's father, an American Army civilian was working in Vietnam when he married a local Vietnamese woman. Smotherman was born in Vietnam, but his family moved to Arizona when he was a baby. He graduated from Greenway High School where he was an All State soccer player. Smotherman attended Lander College, playing on the men's soccer team from 1988 to 1991. He was a 1991 NAIA All American and graduated with a bachelor's degree in exercise science. Smotherman began his career with the South Carolina Shamrocks of the . In 1997, he moved to the New Orleans Riverboat Gamblers of the USISL A-League. In 1998, he became a player/assistant coach with the Gamblers who were renamed the New Orleans Storm in 1999 before disbanding in 2000.

In 2005, Smotherman became the head coach of the Brother Martin High School boys’ soccer team. In April 2013, Smotherman became the soccer director at Brother Martin.
