= Silcock Family =

The Silcock Family is a family from Huntington Beach, California, United States, consisting of many adopted disabled boys and two parents, now divorced. As of March 2008, the Silcock Family had adopted 59 sons. They have recorded music, and performed in one episode of Nanny 911.

== Biography ==
A diving accident in 1987 resulted in the father, Jim Silcock, becoming a quadriplegic with minimal mobility. The mother, Ann Belles, had been involved in foster parenting since she was 19 years old.

The couple first met on the internet. They met in-person for the first time in January 1998 and got married four months later.

The parents own a small business called First Step Supported Living, which helps disabled persons live independent lives. With governmental financial aid given to some of the boys, along with donations from the community, the family is able to support itself financially.

The Silcocks adopt children who have disabilities and are of different ethnicities. They feel that such children are the most overlooked amongst adoption agencies and therefore have the most trouble getting adopted.

== Divorce ==
Ann Belles and Jim Silcock had an uncontested divorce in 2011, which the divorce mediator characterized as friendly, quick, and focused on the needs of their sons.

== In popular culture ==
The family is best known for being featured in an episode of the former Fox reality television series Nanny 911.

The family appears with California-based singer-songwriter Dave Nachmanoff in an album.
