= Chris Mahaffey =

American soccer coach

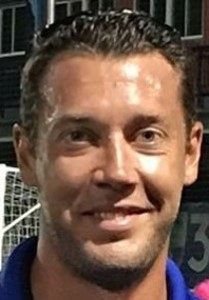

Personal information
- Full name: Christopher Mahaffey
- Place of birth: Atlanta, Georgia, United States
- Height: 6 ft 2 in (1.88 m)
- Position: Midfielder

Youth career
- 2003: Georgia State University

Senior career*
Years	Team	Apps	(Gls)
2004	KFC Uerdingen	4	(5)
2007	Atlanta Silverbacks U23s	7	(1)
2008	Atlanta Silverbacks	22	(0)

Managerial career
- 2016: Georgia Revolution FC (assistant)
- 2017: Georgia Revolution FC
- * Club domestic league appearances and goals as of October 1, 2008

Chris Mahaffey (born in Atlanta, Georgia) is an American soccer coach.

Mahaffey grew up in Conyers, Georgia, where he was the Georgia State 4A soccer Player of the Year at Heritage High School. He also played for several youth teams, including the Brookwood Steamers, Stone Mountain Storm, Norcross Fury and AFC Lightning, which won the 2004 State Cup. In 2003, he spent a single season with the Georgia State University men's soccer team, where he was the Colonial Athletic Association Freshman of the Year. In 2004, he moved to Germany for a trial with KFC Uerdingen in the third division. In 2007, he played for the Atlanta Silverbacks U23s of the fourth division Premier Development League. In 2008, he was called up to the club's senior team, the Atlanta Silverbacks of the USL First Division.

In 2011 Mahaffey was recognized as the Georgia Soccer Girls Select Coach of the year. Mahaffey was the director of coaching at Coweta Soccer Association and formally the assistant coach for Oglethorpe University Women's Soccer. Mahaffey is currently the executive director for Henry County Soccer Association.

In 2016 Mahaffey was hired as the assistant head coach of the Georgia Revolution FC of the National Premier Soccer League. Entering into the 2017 season, he was promoted to the team's head coach.
