= Tessa King-Farlow =

British garden designer (born 1941)

Tessa King-Farlow (born 2 February 1941) is a British garden designer, former chair of the Birmingham Royal Ballet, and former High Sheriff of the West Midlands.

Tessa King-Farlow was educated at Downe House School. She moved to Birmingham in 1967. She studied English Language at the University of Birmingham as a mature student, graduating with a BA degree. Farlow-King was High Sheriff of the West Midlands from 2001 to 2002. She was chair of the Royal Opera House Benevolent Fund, and remains on its Board. She was chair of Birmingham Royal Ballet from 2004 to 2009 and had been a member of the board. She was a governor of the Royal Ballet School and of Elmhurst School for Dance. She was a Justice of the Peace on the Birmingham Bench. She was chair of the Council of St Philip's Cathedral, Birmingham, from 2003 to 2004. She was also a member of the Advisory Committee of Birmingham Botanical Gardens, of the board of the City of Birmingham Touring Opera, of the board of Ikon Gallery, and of the board of Kings Norton Community Development Trust. She was trustee of Music in May at St Ives. She is a current trustee of the Sacconi Trust. King-Farlow was awarded the Honorary degree of Doctor of Music (DMus) by the University of Birmingham in 2009. She is a trustee of the Friends of Vauxhall Park.
