= Edwin Hardwick Moore =

British businessman and politician

High Sheriff of the West Midlands
- In office 1975–1976

Vice Chairman of Severn River Authority
- In office 1970–1974

Personal details
- Born: 6 October 1910
- Died: 2004 (aged 93–94)
- Education: Christ's College, Cambridge

Edwin Hardwick Moore (6 October 1910 in Sutton Coldfield – 2004) was a British businessman and High Sheriff of the West Midlands for 1975–76.

He was the son of E. E. Moore and was educated at Repton School and Christ's College, Cambridge.

In 1938, he married Phyllis Mary Underwood, having been recently appointed managing director of Alfred Adams and Co. Ltd., of West Bromwich. Previously to that, he had spent four years (1933–37) as a farmer.

In 1944, he was promoted from managing director to chairman of the board, a post he retained until 1980.

He was a member of Warwickshire County Council from 1959 to 1967 and then alderman from 1967 until the post was abolished by the local government re-organisations of 1974. Throughout his tenure as alderman, he was also chairman of the council planning committee.

He was a member of the Severn River Authority from 1965 to 1974 (Vice Chairman from 1970 to 1974).

He served as High Sheriff of the West Midlands for 1975–76.

Honorary titles
Preceded by Michael Hotham Cadbury	High Sheriff of the West Midlands; 1975–1976	Succeeded by J. H. C. Horsfall
