= Jumelle Brooks =

American politician

Member of the South Carolina House of Representatives from the 12th district
- Incumbent
- Assumed office December 14, 2026
- Preceded by: Daniel Gibson

Personal details
- Party: Democratic
- Education: Lander University (BS)

Jumelle Brooks is an American politician. She is a member-elect of the South Carolina House of Representatives from the 12th District. She is a member of the Democratic party.

== Early life and education ==
Brooks received a doctorate in Policy and Advocacy from Capella University in 2016, an MBA from Webster University in 2003, and a BS in Business/Healthcare Management from Lander University in 2003.

== Political career ==
In the 2026 general election, Brooks unseated Republican incumbent Daniel Gibson, who held the office since 2022. She received 54.9% of the total vote.
