= Darlene Goff =

Brigadier General Darlene M. Goff
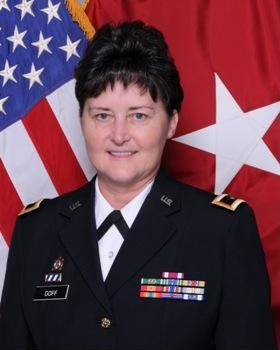
- Darlene M. Goff
- Spouse: Colonel Eddie Goff
- Military career
- Allegiance: United States
- Branch: National Guard
- Service years: 37 years
- Rank: Brigadier General
- Awards: Meritorious Service Medal Army Commendation Medal with 3 Bronze Oak Leaf Clusters, Army Achievement Medal with 1 Bronze Oak Leaf Clusters, Army Reserve Component Achievement Medal with 1 Silver and 1 Bronze Oak Leaf Cluster, National Defense Service Medal with 1 Bronze Star, Global War on Terrorism Service Medal, Armed Forces Reserve Medal with Gold Hourglass Devise, Army Service Ribbon, Army Reserve Component Overseas Training Ribbon with Numeral 2, and South Carolina Governor’s Unit Citation

Brigadier General Darlene M. Goff (Ret.) is the first female general officer of the South Carolina National Guard. She retired in March 2015.

== Education ==
Goff is originally from Ninety Six, South Carolina.

She graduated from Lander in 1978 with a Bachelor of Science degree in sociology. In 1993, Goff earned her Master of Arts degree in Computer and Information Resource Management from Webster University. She also has a Master of Strategic Studies Degree from the United States Army War College, which she earned in 2007.

In 2011, Goff was the commencement speaker at Lander, and was given an honorary Doctor of Science Degree.

== National Guard ==
After college she was looking for work, and talked with a Guard recruiter. Her first job was as a telecommunications center operator, or as Goff put it, "a typist."

In 1977, Goff enlisted.

In 1981, she finished officer training at Palmetto Military Academy in Columbia, and earned her commission as second lieutenant.

Over 29 years she would continue to move up in rank. On June 25, 1984, she was promoted to first lieutenant. She moved up to captain four years later. On March 1, 1996, Goff was then promoted to major. It wouldn't be until 2004 when she'd rise in rank to lieutenant colonel. Three years later on April 26, Goff earned the title of colonel. On December 22, 2010, she was again promoted. This time to brigadier general. Her various positions in these roles included communications, maintenance, headquarters, and human resource units.

On September 26, 2011, Brigadier General Goff assumed her duties as the Director of Joint Staff, also known as the South Carolina's Army and Air Guard Leadership Group. In turn, she became the first female general officer in the South Carolina Military Department. Her duties in this particular role included leadership development for the South Carolina National Guard. She was responsible for the Guard's in-state operations if they were called by the government to take care of natural or man-made disasters. She was one of only 21 female officers in the National Guard, and the highest-ranking female officer of the South Carolina Army National Guard. In March 2015, after 37 years in uniform, Brigadier General Goff formally stepped down from her position and retired.

Over her career, she had been sent to Japan, Okinawa, Panama, and Belgium.

Goff is a member of many different boards and organizations: National Guard Association of the United States, South Carolina National Guard Association, Leadership South Carolina, Diversity of the Midlands: South Carolina, and Board of Directors Alston Wilkes Society. She is also the Vice Chair of the Youth ChalleNGe Board.

== Awards ==
Goff has earned numerous awards. These include:

- Meritorious Service Medal
- Army Commendation Medal with 3 Bronze Oak Leaf Clusters
- Army Achievement Medal with 1 Bronze Oak Leaf Clusters
- Army Reserve Component Achievement Medal with 1 Silver and 1 Bronze Oak Leaf Cluster
- National Defense Service Medal with 1 Bronze Star
- Global War on Terrorism Service Medal
- Armed Forces Reserve Medal with Gold Hourlgass Devise
- Army Service Ribbon
- Army Reserve Component Overseas Training Ribbon with Numeral 2
- South Carolina's Governor's Unit Citation

== Personal life ==
Goff is married to Colonel Eddie Goff, USA (Ret.), a 34-year Army Veteran.
