= Wendy Lee Queen =

American chemist and material scientist

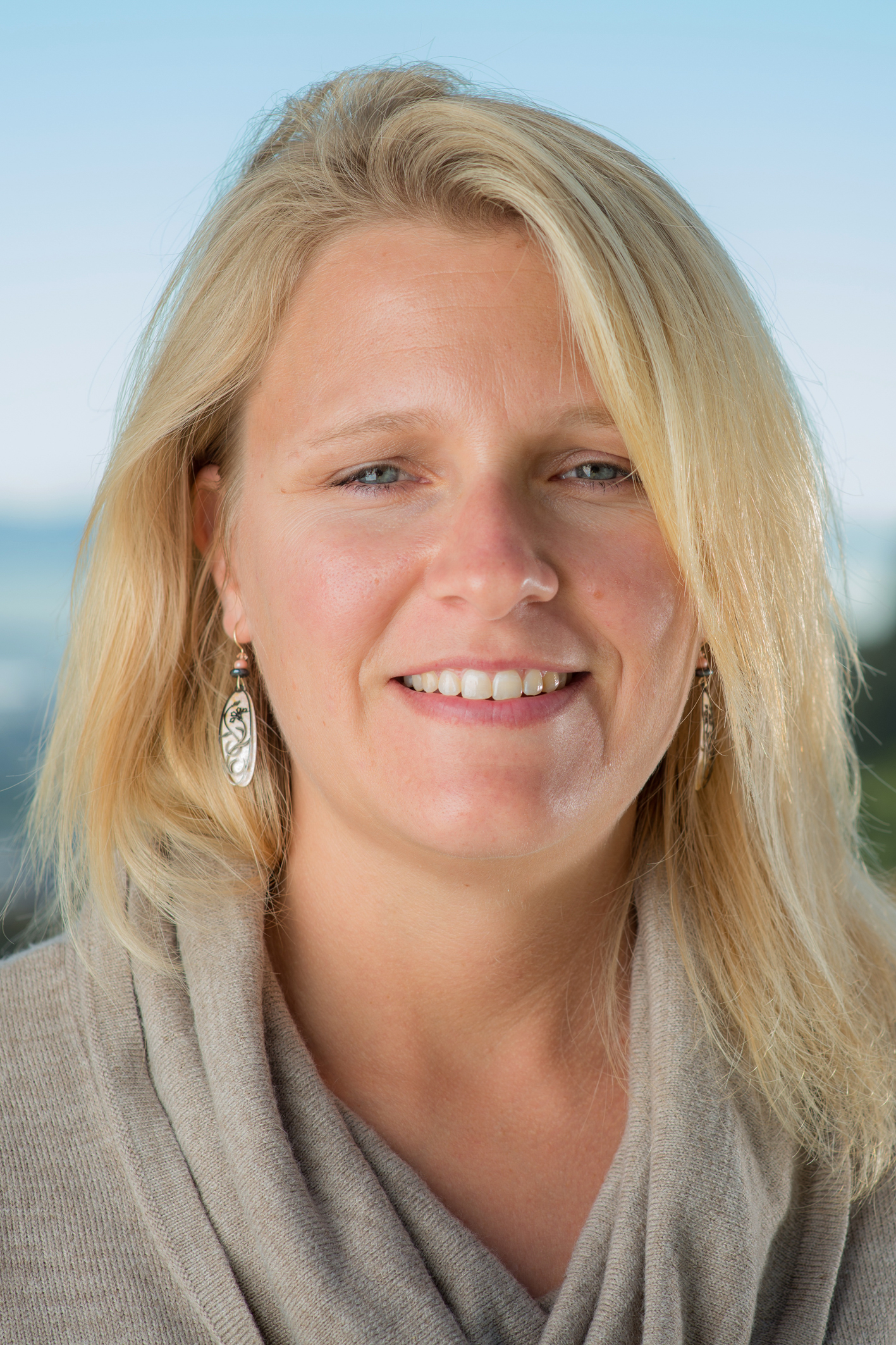
- Portrait of Wendy Lee Queen
- Born: 1981 (age 44–45)
- Citizenship: American
- Education: Lander University; Clemson University
- Known for: Platform for the design of porous materials capable of capturing molecules
- Scientific career
- Workplaces: Laboratory for Functional Inorganic Materials at École polytechnique fédérale de Lausanne
- Website: https://www.epfl.ch/labs/lfim/

Wendy Lee Queen (born 1981 in South Carolina) is an American chemist and material scientist. Her research interest focus on development design and production of hybrid organic/inorganic materials at the intersection of chemistry, chemical engineering and material sciences. As of 2022 she is an associate professor at the École polytechnique fédérale de Lausanne (EPFL) in Switzerland, where she directs the Laboratory for Functional Inorganic Materials.

== Career ==
Queen studied chemistry and mathematics at Lander University in Greenwood, South Carolina, USA. She then pursued a PhD in inorganic chemistry at Clemson University under the mentorship of Shiou-Jyh Hwu. In 2009 she joined the Center for Neutron Research at National Institute of Standards and Technology. From 2011 to 2012 she was a visiting scholar in laboratory of Jeffrey R. Long at University of California Berkeley before returning to the Center for Neutron Research as a postdoctoral fellow with Craig Brown.

In the position of a project scientist, Queen joined the Molecular Foundry at Lawrence Berkeley National Laboratory in 2012. Here she helped build a new user program focused on the synthesis and characterization of porous adsorbents. During her time there she worked on a number of projects focused on the use of polymer-metal-organic frameworks (MOF) or MOF-based membranes for a variety of globally relevant gas separations such as carbon dioxide capture from flue gas and water capture from air.

In 2015, she was nominated as tenure-track assistant professor at Department of Chemical Engineering of École polytechnique fédérale de Lausanne (EPFL) in Switzerland. Her Laboratory for Functional Inorganic Materials is based at the EPFL Valais Wallis campus in Sion, Switzerland.

== Research ==
Queen's research is focused on the synthesis and characterization of novel porous adsorbents, namely metal-organic frameworks, and their corresponding composites, which are of interest in a number of host-guest applications. Her research aims at contributing knowledge towards solving globally relevant problems, like reducing energy consumption, cutting CO_{2} emissions, water purification, the extraction of valuable commodities from waste, and chemical conversion processes.

Queen became known to a wider audience through her TEDx Talk on "Cut Carbon to Save Lives", her Aeon article on "Could mining gold from waste reduce its great cost?", and multiple appearances in the news outlets.

== Distinctions ==
In 2020, Queen was nominated as one of Chemical & Engineering News's “Talented 12”. She is a member of the board of Scientific Advisors at novoMOF.
