= Hameldon Community College =

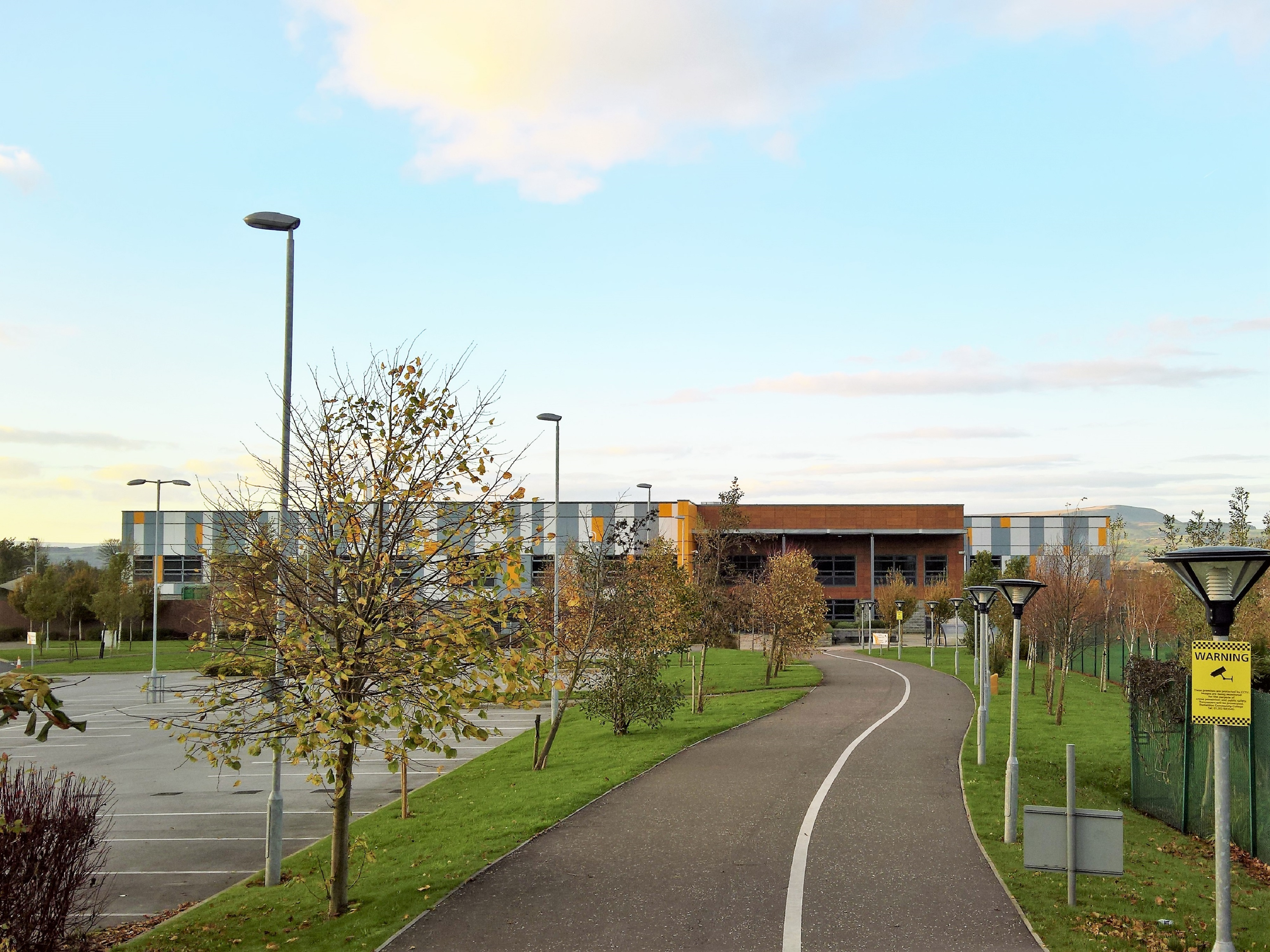

Location
- Coal Clough Lane; Burnley, Lancashire, BB11 5BT; England; 53.781°N 2.267°W

Information
- Type: Community
- Established: 2006
- Closed: 2019
- Local authority: Lancashire
- Department for Education URN: 134995 Tables
- Ofsted: Reports
- Gender: mixed
- Age: 11 to 16
- Website: http://www.hameldon.lancs.sch.uk/

Hameldon Community College was a mixed 11–16 comprehensive school located in Burnley, Lancashire, England.

== History ==
The school opened in September 2006 as part of an ambitious plan to replace all of the district's eight 11-16 schools, funded by a government public–private partnership programme called Building Schools for the Future. It was formed from the merger of Habergham High School and Ivy Bank Business and Enterprise College and initially occupied the adjacent sites of the former schools.

The buildings of the former Ivy Bank Business and Enterprise College

=== Former schools ===
Habergham High School was formed in 1981 from the merger of the male Burnley Grammar School and the neighbouring female Burnley High School for Girls and quickly earned a reputation as the borough's leading mixed comprehensive school.

Ivy Bank was initially a girls' high school that shared the site of the other two schools, and it also became a mixed comprehensive in 1981. This school enjoyed a steadily improving reputation, becoming one of the first specialist business and enterprise colleges in the country in 2002.

=== Early history ===
The school suffered an unexpectedly troubled birth, with the police attending numerous violent incidents in the first few weeks of its opening. This resulted in the installation of a CCTV system in the school's temporary buildings. The institution was put into special measures by OFSTED after an inspection in February 2007 in which it was placed in the lowest category (Grade 4), and saw a drop in pupil numbers. A serious racially motivated assault in December 2007 resulted in a large drop in attendance, and marked the lowest point in the school's history to date. In June 2009, the school came out of special measures and was awarded the status of a "satisfactory, but an improving school".

=== New building ===
Hameldon moved 1.4 miles (2.3 km) to a new £22m building on Coal Clough Lane (the site of the former St Hilda's School) in September 2010. The grounds were host to a variety of student learning resources such as pets: guinea pigs; three chickens (Mitilda, Elmo, and Chicken Licken, which give eggs to the school, which sells them); and fish, frogs and ducks in the pond. In 2016 the headteacher, Gill Broom retired and was replaced by Associate Headteacher, Gillian Jackson, who was then later replaced by three headteachers sharing the role.

=== Closure ===
Hameldon Community College formally closed in August 2019 due to low attainment and financial concerns caused by low pupil numbers.

=== Legacy ===
Despite the closure of the college, the building remains a Private finance initiative (PFI) building and the Lancashire County Council will continue paying for the building until 2036 at which point it takes ownership. Hence the building has been put to alternative use. In 2019 the Rhyddings Business and Enterprise School temporarily relocated to the former Hameldon College building whilst their own building was demolished and rebuilt. Once Rhyddings returns to their own site in 2022, Lancashire County Council is expected to continue to provide other services from the former Hameldon building.

== Attainment ==
Pupils with equivalent of 5 or more GCSEs grade C or above (inc. English & Maths)
Year (Source)	Students	% special educational needs	England %	School %
2004* (BBC)(BBC)	(171 186) 357	(4.1 3.2) 3.6	42.7	(55.0 40.0) 47.0
2005* (BBC)(BBC	(173 192) 365	(6.4 12.0) 9.3	44.9	(49.0 31.0) 40.0
2006	-	-	-	-
2007 (BBC)	359	7.0	46.7	36.0
2008 (BBC)	331	5.1	47.6	35.0
2009 (BBC)	293	15.0	49.8	38.0
2010 (DfE)	253	34.3	53.4	36.0
2011 (DfE)	152	21.0	58.9	41.0
2012 (DfE)	95	16.0	59.4	43.0
2013 (DfE)	84	26.0	59.2	32.0
2014 (DfE)	45	7.0	53.4	56.0
2015 (DfE)	66	9.0	53.8	36.0
*Figures for previous school, in this case: Habergam High & Ivy Bank High Schools

In 2007, the school's value-added measure was 970.1 (national average 1000), which placed it in the bottom 5% nationally for adding value between the end of Key Stage 2 and the end of Key Stage 4. By 2010 this figure had fallen to 953.6, placing it in the bottom 100 schools nationally.

== Notable former pupils ==
=== Habergham ===
- Stella Reid, TV nanny (Sixth-form only)

=== Ivy Bank ===
- Sophie Hitchon, British women's record holding hammer thrower
