= Luke Jordan (footballer) =

English footballer

Personal information
- Full name: Luke MacAuley Jordan
- Date of birth: 21 November 1998 (age 27)
- Place of birth: Burnley, England
- Position: Winger

Youth career
- 2016–2018: Morecambe

Senior career*
Years	Team	Apps	(Gls)
2017–2018	Morecambe	7	(0)
2018	→ Kendal Town (loan)	6	(1)
2018	Ramsbottom United	11	(1)
2018–2019	Chester	9	(0)
2018–2019	Lancaster City (dual registration)	12	(0)
2019–2020	Georgia State Panthers	5	(4)
2020–2021	Lander Bearcats	24	(7)
2022	Padiham	3	(0)
- * Club domestic league appearances and goals as of 00:43, 5 January 2024 (UTC)

Luke MacAuley Jordan (born 21 November 1998) is an English footballer who played as a winger for the Lander Bearcats.

== Career ==
Jordan was born in Burnley, Lancashire and attended Unity College. He began his career with Morecambe and made his professional debut on 7 January 2017 in a 4–1 victory against Notts County at the Globe Arena.

Jordan signed for Kendal Town on one-month youth loan on 26 February 2018.

He was released by Morecambe at the end of the 2017–18 season.

After joining Chester from Ramsbottom United in the summer of 2018, Jordan joined Lancaster City in November 2018 on a dual-registration deal.

In 2019, Jordan enrolled at Georgia State University to play for the men's soccer program.

In 2020, he transferred to Lander University to play for the Bearcats.

== Career statistics ==
As of match played 1 July 2018

Appearances and goals by club, season and competition
Club	Season	League			FA Cup		League Cup		Other		Total	
Club	Season	Division	Apps	Goals	Apps	Goals	Apps	Goals	Apps	Goals	Apps	Goals
Morecambe	2016–17	League Two	6	0	0	0	0	0	0	0	6	0
Morecambe	2017–18	League Two	1	0	0	0	0	0	0	0	1	0
Career total			7	0	0	0	0	0	0	0	7	0
