= Lander University =

Public college in Greenwood, South Carolina, US

- Seal of Lander University
- Former names: Williamston Female College (1872–1898); Lander College (1898–1992)
- Motto: Puritas et Scientia (Latin)
- Motto in English: "Purity and Knowledge"
- Type: Public university
- Established: 1872
- Endowment: $32M
- President: Richard Cosentino
- Faculty: 191
- Students: Nearly 4,850
- Location: Greenwood, South Carolina, United States; 34°12′1″N 82°9′56″W
- Colors: Blue and gold
- Nickname: LU
- Sporting affiliations: NCAA Division II – Peach Belt Conference
- Mascot: Bearcat
- Website: lander.edu
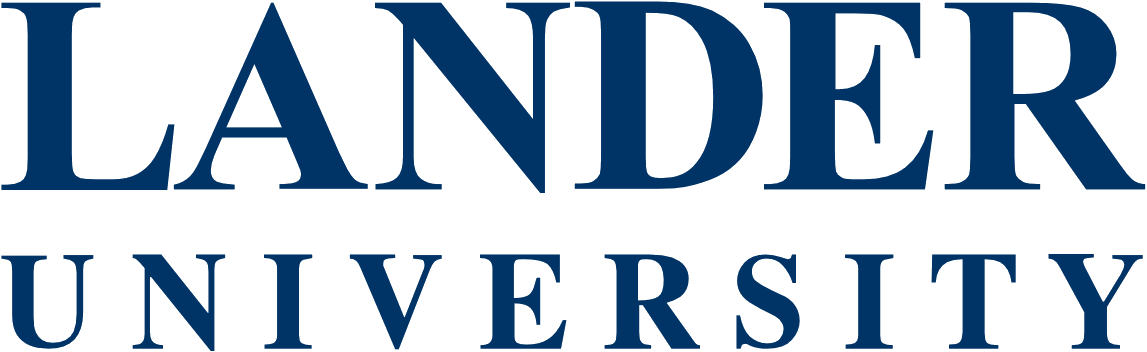

Lander University is a public university in Greenwood, South Carolina, United States. It was founded in 1872. Its intercollegiate athletic teams compete in NCAA Division II.

== History ==
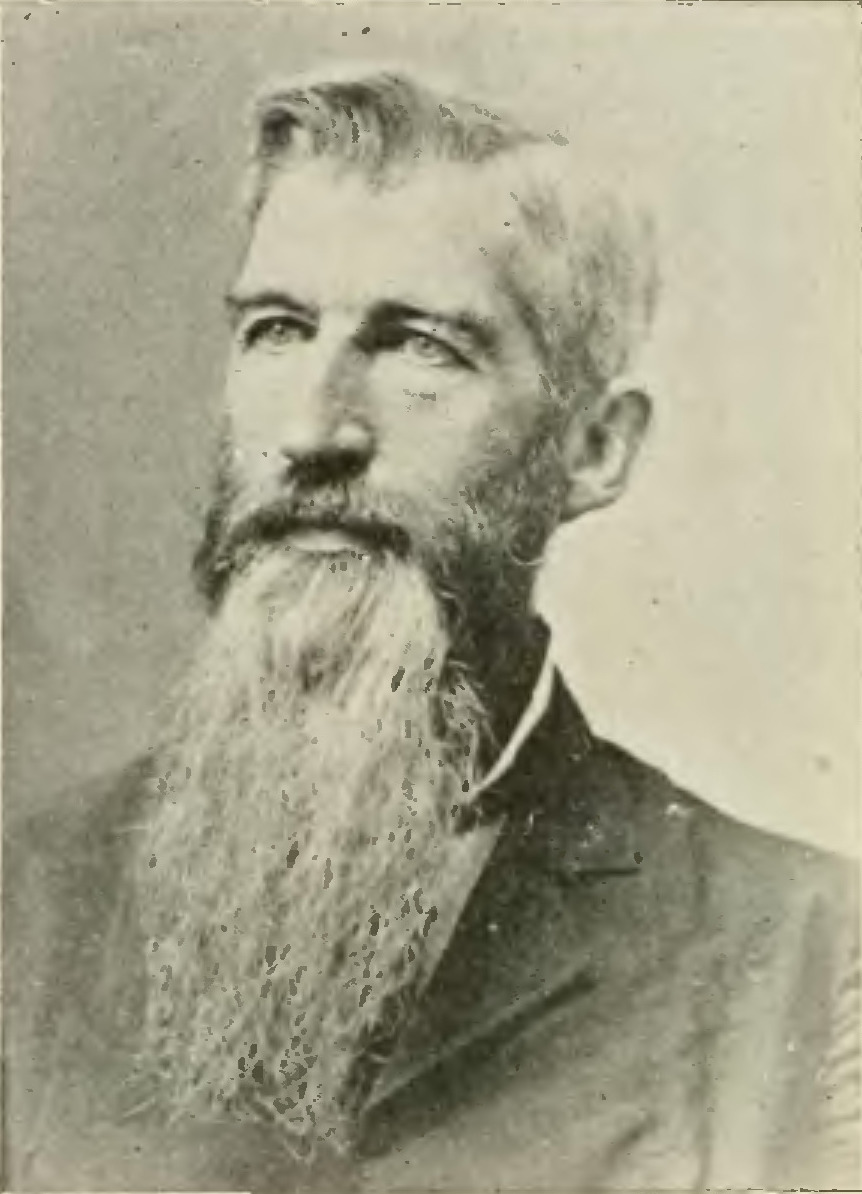
Reverend Samuel Lander, founder

Lander University was founded as a college for women by the Methodist clergyman Samuel Lander in 1872 as Williamston Female College in Williamston, South Carolina. It was re-named Lander College in 1904. Men were admitted starting in 1943 and it became a university in 1992.

Lander University has had twelve presidents serve since its founding. They are: Samuel Lander (1872–1904); John O. Willson (1904–1923); B. Rhett Turnipseed (1923–1927); R. H. Bennett (1927–1932); John W. Speake (1932–1941); John Marvin Rast (1941–1948); Boyce M. Grier (1948–1966); E. Don Herd, Jr. (1966–1973); Larry A. Jackson (1973–1992); William C. Moran (1992–2000); Daniel W. Ball (2000–2015); and Richard E. Cosentino (2015–present).

== Campus ==
Lander University is located approximately one half-mile from uptown Greenwood, South Carolina. The main campus sits on 190 acres of land, though this does not include its many off-campus locations.

Lander University has ten residence halls. Residence halls include Bearcat Village, Brookside, Centennial Hall, Chipley Hall, Dolny Hall (formerly New Hall), Lide Apartments, McGhee Court, Thomason, University Place, and Williamston. The Lander College Old Main Building is listed on the National Register of Historic Places.

In July 2021, Lander announced that the state legislature has appropriated new funding for the University, which includes money that will be used to construct a nursing building on Lander's campus in Greenwood. Additional funding was appropriated in 2022, including $8 million for a new information commons that will take the place of Jackson Library. An additional $6 million will be used to renovate the existing library into academic space.

== Academics ==
More than 90 areas of undergraduate and graduate studies are offered.

- College of Business and Technology
- College of Education
- College of Graduate & Online Studies
- College of Humanities, Arts and Social Sciences
- College of Nursing, Human Performance and Health Sciences
- College of Science and Mathematics
- Honors College

=== Rankings ===
In 2025, U.S. News and World Report's college and university rankings listed Lander fourteenth among regional colleges in the south and third among public regional colleges in the south.

== Athletics ==
Varsity athletic teams have won at district and national levels, including 12 national championships in men's tennis, and, most recently, in men's wrestling. A member of the NCAA Division II, Lander plays in the Peach Belt Conference and fields teams in men's and women's basketball, lacrosse, soccer, and tennis; men's baseball and golf; and women's cross country, softball, and volleyball. Lander also offers club sports that include equestrian, ultimate disc, rugby, bass-fishing, lacrosse, soccer, water skiing, running, Cross-Fit, baseball, and women's volleyball and it has an intramural program open to all students, faculty, and staff.

Intercollegiate Varsity Sports
| Men's Sports | Women's Sports | Co-Ed |
|---|---|---|
| Baseball | Basketball | Club Bass Fishing |
| Basketball | Cross Country | Club E-Sports |
| Cross Country | Golf | |
| Golf | Lacrosse | |
| Lacrosse | Soccer | |
| Soccer | Softball | |
| Tennis | Tennis | |
| Track & Field | Volleyball | |
| Wrestling | Field Hockey | |
| Rugby | Rugby | |
| | Track & Field | |
| | Acrobatics & Tumbling | |
| | Cheer & Dance | |
| | Equestrian | |

== Student life ==
Undergraduate demographics as of Fall 2023
| Race and ethnicity | Total |
|---|---|
| White | 65% |
| Black | 24% |
| Unknown | 5% |
| International student | 3% |
| Hispanic | 2% |
| American Indian/Alaska Native | 1% |
| Native Hawaiian/Pacific Islander | 1% |
Economic diversity
| Low-income (Note: The percentage of students who received an income-based federal Pell grant intended for low-income students.) | 41% |
| Affluent (Note: The percentage of students who are a part of the American middle class at the bare minimum.) | 59% |

Sorority and fraternity organizations are under three different councils, these being the National Pan-Hellenic Council (NPHC), National Panhellenic Conference (NPC), and Interfraternity Council (IFC).

== Notable people ==
=== Alumni ===
- Adam Arthur, professional soccer player
- Martin Barba, professional tennis player
- Joshua Bertie, professional soccer player
- Chris Blair, radio broadcaster for the LSU Tigers athletics
- Stacey Copeland, professional boxer and soccer player
- Ida Jane Dacus, the first professionally trained librarian in South Carolina
- Fraser Ellard, professional baseball player
- Billy Garrett, member of the South Carolina Senate
- Darlene Goff, first female general officer of the South Carolina National Guard
- Olivier Guéguen, professional soccer player
- Luke Jordan, professional football player
- Steve Kennedy, professional tennis player
- Jim Lander, South Carolina Senate between 1993 and 1999 and former Comptroller General of South Carolina
- Leon Lott, commander of the South Carolina State Guard and the sheriff of Richland County, South Carolina.
- Stephen Magennis, professional soccer player and assistant soccer coach at Georgia Gwinnett College
- Tom Marriott, professional soccer player
- Michael Pitts, former member of the South Carolina House of Representatives
- Wendy Lee Queen, chemist, material scientist. and assistant professor at the École polytechnique fédérale de Lausanne
- Catharine Rembert, artist, designer, and art educator
- Clément Simonin, professional soccer player
- Jordan Skelton, professional soccer player
- Louie Smothermon, professional soccer player
- Molly Spearman, educator and South Carolina Superintendent of Education from 2015 to 2023
- Miriam Stevenson, television host, actress, former model, and Miss Universe 1954
- Everett Stubbs, member of the South Carolina Senate
- Hanin Tamim, professional soccer player
- Jumelle Brooks, member of the South Carolina House of Representatives

=== Faculty and staff ===
Lander has 178 full-time faculty members. Notable current and former faculty and staff include:

- Christina Jeffrey, political science lecturer
- Helen Lemme, faculty and civil rights advocate
- Stephen Magennis, soccer coach
- John R. McCravy III, attorney, member of the South Carolina House of Representatives, and law professor
- Mike McGuire, baseball coach
- Billy Mims, basketball coach
- Les Robinson, interim athletic director
- Kermit Smith, baseball coach
- Rusty Stroupe, baseball coach
- Eugene Van Taylor, soccer coach
- Beverly J. Warren, professor

== See also ==
- List of colleges and universities in South Carolina
- List of current and historical women's universities and colleges
