= Ida Jane Dacus =

American librarian (1875–1964)

Ida Jane Dacus (September 9, 1875 – October 18, 1964) was the first professionally trained librarian in the state of South Carolina.

== Early life and education ==
Ida Jane Dacus was born in Williamston, Anderson, South Carolina, to father John Arving Dacus and mother Sara Elizabeth Hogg. She was the oldest of four children.

She attended Williamston Female Academy, which is now Lander University. In 1896, the Winthrop Normal and Industrial College opened in Rock Hill, South Carolina, and Dacus continued her education there. At the time of the school's founding, the library consisted of a study hall and a small collection of two hundred books. Dacus was one of three girls who received a scholarship to maintain the school's library. Following her junior year, Dacus was asked by Winthrop President David Bancroft Johnson to head the school's library. Her salary was $20 per month including housing.

In 1901, Dacus attended the Drexel Institute in Philadelphia after competing in a nationwide exam in which she won a scholarship to study library science. The following year, she and fifteen others became the first trained librarians in the entire Southern United States.

== Impact ==
When Ida Jane Dacus began as head librarian at Winthrop University, the library only had 5,184 books and 5,000 volumes of government publications. In 1905, construction started on a new library after the Carnegie Foundation donated $20,000 to Winthrop. The next year, the foundation increased their donation to $30,000 and added 500 books, contingent on the new library offering library methods courses and serving as a training school. In 1907, Dacus inaugurated two classes in library science: one in reference and the other in elementary library methods for schoolteachers. Library methods instructors in other parts of York County highly respected Dacus and used her courses at their own institutions. Due to Dacus' impact, library methods courses were common by the late 1920s.

Dacus was an active member of the South Carolina Teachers’ Association, the National Education Association, and the American Library Association. Known as “Miss Ida" to her students, Dacus had a love of gardening and created the “Miss Dacus Garden” on the campus of Winthrop University.

== Later life and legacy ==
Dacus retired in 1945 after working at the Winthrop library for 43 years. In 1959, she received the Mary Mildred Sullivan Medallion, the highest alumna award offered by Winthrop University. In her retirement, Dacus enjoyed gardening, making aprons, quilt collecting, and maintaining her home, a three-hundred-acre cotton farm. Dacus was buried in the Williamston Cemetery after her death due to illness.

In 1969, the Ida Jane Dacus Library was built to replace the Carnegie Library, which is now known as Rutledge Hall. The library was dedicated to Dacus, who had died five years prior.
