= Georgia Revolution FC =

Georgia Revolution
- Full name: Georgia Revolution FC
- Nickname: Revs
- Founded: 2010; 16 years ago
- Stadium: Warhawk Stadium; McDonough, Georgia
- Capacity: 3,300
- President: Eric Morrison
- Head coach: Eric Diaz
- League: United Premier Soccer League
- Website: www.georgiarevolutionfc.com

Georgia Revolution FC is an American soccer club based in McDonough, Georgia, United States. The team competes in the Georgia Premier Division of the United Premier Soccer League (UPSL), the fourth tier of the United States soccer league system.

== History ==
The Georgia Revolution FC was founded in 2010 to begin play in the National Premier Soccer League (NPSL), the fourth tier of the American soccer pyramid. The team was created to serve as the top level of the Rockdale Youth Soccer Association. The Revolution defeated Jacksonville United 2–1 in its first game on May 13, 2011.

The Revolution qualified for the 2012 Lamar Hunt U.S. Open Cup, defeating PDL side Mississippi Brilla on May 15, 2012, on a header goal scored by Hailob Habtom in extra time. They moved on to the next round and faced the NASL's Atlanta Silverbacks, where they lost 1–0 thanks to a goal by Raphael Cox. Later in their season they defeated the reigning NPSL champions, Jacksonville United, 7–3 in a regular season match.

The Revolution would again qualify for the Open Cup in 2013 and see a rematch against second division state rivals, Atlanta Silverbacks, losing 3–2.

Following the 2015 regular season, the team participated in the NPSL playoffs losing to the Atlanta Silverbacks (NPSL). At the end of 2015, the Revolution was sold by the Rockdale Youth Soccer Association to a new ownership group.

In 2016, the Revolution won the inaugural I-20 Cup by defeating the Birmingham Hammers 2–0 on aggregate in the two match tournament.

The 2016–2017 off season brought many changes to the Revs organization. The team was moved from Conyers to McDonough in Henry County, Georgia. The move generated excitement in the local community and brought many more high quality players to the squad. In addition, the Revs Reserves were formed to play in the Atlanta District Amateur Soccer League as a way to develop talent in the local area.

During the 2018 season, the Revs Senior Team's home matches were played at Warhawks Stadium at Henry County High School. This was the first time the team played in a stadium and also live streamed all home games. The team returned to the playoffs for only the third time and made club history by winning its first playoff game 3–2 over the New Orleans Jesters with goals by Ehjayson Henry, Jumar Oakley and Isaac Promise.

In 2019, the club won its first trophy in its history. The 2018/2019 ADASL season saw the Georgia Revolution Reserves win the division 1 championship, winning the trophy and the entry into the 2019-2020 US Open Cup qualifiers. The team competed in the 2019 NPSL summer season, where the club finished 3-1-6 and 5th in the southeast conference, just missing out on the playoffs. On September 21, the reserves team began its US open cup journey away at ATLetic FC in Sandy Springs, Georgia. The Revolution emerged victorious with a 1–0 win. The club was drawn away to Soda City FC of Columbia, South Carolina. The game was played on November 2 with Soda City prevailing 4–2.

In 2020, the NPSL summer season was cancelled due to COVID-19. The club missed out on play until July, when the club joined the NISA Independent Cup, along with Chattanooga FC, Soda City FC, and Savannah Clovers. The club finished 4th in the group, going 0–1–3.

2021 was the best season to date in club history. The squad won the NPSL Southeast conference, finishing the regular season 8-1-1 ranked #9 in the Nation. They went on to win both conference playoff games, defeating LSA on PKs and Georgia Storm 2–1 in the final. In the Regional semi-final, the Revs fell on a late goal 1–2 to Motown FC in Baltimore. The team's performance qualified them for the 2022 US Open Cup. Rev Defender Oier Bernaola was voted the NPSL Player of the Year.

2022 saw the Revs return to the Lamar Hunt US Open Cup, losing a highly contested match to Southern States of the NPSL in Hattiesburg, MS in the first round. The team had another strong performance in NPSL play, earning second place in the Southeast Conference but fell to North Alabama SC 0–1 in the playoffs. Defender George Maxwell earned NPSL Region XI honors and Southeast Conference XI along with teammates Sebastian Doppelhofer, Kimo Lemki, and Callum Schorah.

== Colors and badge ==
=== Crest ===
In 2016 a new crest was introduced. Paying homage to the history of the team, the new crest keeps the familiar Eagle's Head and patriotic red, white, and blue colors. Transitioning to a circle which unites the entire crest symbolizing the team motto "United We Stand" while highlighting the name Georgia Revolution FC and the year the team was established, 2010.

=== Colors ===
The colors of the Georgia Revolution FC are red, white, and blue. For the first five seasons of the club's existence they wore blue or white jerseys with matching shorts and red/white striped or blue/white striped socks. For 2016, Joma was the kit supplier. With that came a change to a red and white striped home jersey and a white away jersey. Both jerseys are worn with blue shorts and either blue or white socks. In 2019, Summa Sportwear became the new kit supplier and the away kit was changed to all blue.

=== Sponsorship ===
| Date | Primary sponsor | Kit manufacturer |
|---|---|---|
| 2011–2014 | Courtesy Ford | Stanno |
| 2015 | Beasley Pharmacy | Stanno |
| 2016 | BenchMark Physical Therapy | Joma |
| 2017–2018 | Eagles Landing Family Practice | Joma |
| 2019–2021 | Resurgens Orthopaedics | Summa Sportswear |
| 2022–present | The Sellers Law Firm | Summa Sportswear |

== Club culture ==
=== Rivalries ===
When the Georgia Storm FC joined the NPSL in 2021, a new rivalry was born. The Revs went on to win that game 1–0 with a late goal. The two teams played to a draw in a game later that season and faced off in the Conference Championship, which the Revs won 2–1. For several years, the Georgia Revolution FC's primary rival were the crosstown Atlanta Silverbacks. The teams first played in the 2012 US Open Cup and again in 2013. When the Silverbacks left the North American Soccer League to join the NPSL in 2016 the rivalry was rekindled but ended when the Silverbacks folded after the 2019 season. In the past, the club had a burgeoning rivalry with the Birmingham Hammers. The two teams competed annually for the I-20 Cup, a competition instituted by the two clubs. The cup was awarded to the team that had the most points across the teams' meetings throughout the season. The Birmingham Hammers moved to the PDL in 2018.

=== Supporters ===
The major supporters' group is The Uprising.The Uprising was created on April 29, 2017. They are known to "wave flags, set off fan smoke matching our colors, beat drums and provide great support to our players and a great atmosphere to all attendees.” In addition, they have hosted public tailgates before home matches.

=== Affiliates ===
Georgia Revolution FC works with several youth soccer organizations in the community, most notably Lake Country United FC.

== Records ==
=== Team records ===
Year-by-Year

| Season | Domestic League | | | | | | | | | U.S. Open Cup | Head coach | Average Attendance |
| Season | League | GP | W | D | L | Pts | Conference | Pos. | Playoffs | U.S. Open Cup | Head coach | Average Attendance |
|---|---|---|---|---|---|---|---|---|---|---|---|---|
| 2011 | NPSL | 10 | 4 | 2 | 4 | 14 | Southeast Conference | 2nd | Did not qualify | Did not enter | (United States) Rafe Mauran | 400 |
| 2012 | NPSL | 10 | 7 | 1 | 2 | 22 | Southeast Conference | 1st | Division Final | 2nd round | (United States) John Sprague | 400 |
| 2013 | NPSL | 8 | 4 | 2 | 2 | 14 | Sunshine Conference | 2nd | Did not qualify | 1st round | (United States) John Sprague | 200 |
| 2014 | NPSL | 10 | 1 | 1 | 8 | 4 | Southeast Conference | 6th | Did not qualify | Did not qualify | (United States) Robin D. Dixon | 200 |
| 2015 | NPSL | 10 | 4 | 2 | 4 | 14 | Southeast Conference | 3rd | Conference Quarterfinal | Did not qualify | (United States) Robin D. Dixon | 100 |
| 2016 | NPSL | 10 | 1 | 2 | 7 | 5 | South Atlantic Conference | 6th | Did not qualify | Did not qualify | (Germany) Juergen Mauer | 125 |
| 2017 | NPSL | 12 | 0 | 3 | 9 | 3 | Southeast Conference | 5th | Did not qualify | Did not qualify | (United States) Chris Mahaffey | 250 |
| 2018 | NPSL | 14 | 5 | 3 | 6 | 18 | Southeast Conference | 6th | Conference Semifinal | Did not qualify | (Republic of Ireland) Stephen Magennis | 350 |
| 2019 | NPSL | 10 | 3 | 1 | 6 | 10 | Southeast Conference | 5th | Did not qualify | Did not qualify | (Republic of Ireland) Stephen Magennis | 350 |
| 2020 | NISA Independent Cup | 3 | 0 | 1 | 2 | 1 | Southeast | 4th | N/A | N/A | (United States) Scott Redding | N/A |
| 2021 | NPSL | 13 | 10 | 1 | 2 | 25 | Southeast | Conference Champions | Regional semifinal | Did not qualify | (England) Ricky Davey | 300 |
| 2022 | NPSL | 11 | 4 | 4 | 3 | 16 | Southeast | 2nd | Conference Semifinal | 1st round | (England) Jack Marchant | 250 |
| 2023 | NPSL | 12 | 6 | 0 | 6 | 15 | Southeast | 2nd | Conference Final | Did not qualify | (England) Jack Marchant | 250 |
| Spring 2024 | United Premier Soccer League | 12 | 5 | 0 | 7 | 15 | Georgia Premier Division | 7th | Playoff Quarterfinals | Did Not Qualify | (United States) Alec Morrison | |
| Fall 2024 | United Premier Soccer League | 13 | 9 | 3 | 1 | 30 | Georgia Premier Division | 3rd | Conference Quarterfinal | Did not qualify | (United States) Alec Morrison | |
| Spring 2025 | United Premier Soccer League | 13 | 8 | 3 | 2 | 26 | Georgia Premier Division | 3rd | Conference Quarterfinal | Did not qualify | (United States) Alec Morrison | |
| Fall 2025 | United Premier Soccer League | 1 | 1 | 0 | 0 | 3 | Georgia Premier Division | 3rd | TBD | TBD | (United States) Alec Morrison | |

Year-by-Year (Rev Reserves)

| Season | League | Season | Perrin Cup | US Open Cup | League Record (W-D-L) | Head coach |
|---|---|---|---|---|---|---|
| 2016–2017 | ADASL DIV II | 2nd | Semi-Finals | Did not enter | 13–2–1 | (United States) Scott Redding |
| 2017–2018 | ADASL DIV I | 2nd | Round of 16 | Did not enter | 13–2–3 | (United States) Scott Redding |
| 2018–2019 | ADASL DIV I | Champions | Round of 16 | Did not enter | 13–1–2 | (United States) Scott Redding |
| 2019–2020 ** | ADASL DIV I | 7th | Round of 8 | 2nd round Qualifiers | 5-4-4 | (United States) Scott Redding |
| 2020-2021 | ADASL DIV I | Champions | N/A | N/A | 7-1-0 | (United States) Chris Jackson |
| 2021-2022 | ADASL DIV I | 4th | Champions | 3rd round Qualifiers | 9-4-5 | (United States) Rob Kytan |
| 2022-2023 | ADASL DIV I | 4th | Semi-finals | Did not enter | 9-5-4 | (United States) Alec Morrison |

Year-by-Year (Revs U23)

| Season | League | Season | Perrin Cup | League Record (W-D-L) | Head coach |
|---|---|---|---|---|---|
| 2017–2018 | ADASL DIV II | 6th | 1st round | 8–5–3 | (United States) Alec Morrison |
| 2018–2019 | ADASL DIV II | 13th | 1st round | 5–2–9 | (United States) Alec Morrison |
| 2019–2020 ** | ADASL DIV II | 1st | Round of 8 | 13-1-2 | (United States) Alec Morrison |
| 2020-2021 | ADASL DIV I | 7th | N/A | 2-5-1 | (United States) Alec Morrison |
| 2020-2021 | ADASL DIV I | 9th | Round of 8 | 3-5-10 | (United States) Alec Morrison |
| 2022-2023 | ADASL DIV II | 4th | Round of 8 | 11-5-4 | (United States) Tim Gilbert |
| Fall 2023 | UPSL DIV I | 2nd | N/A | 10-0-2 | (United States) Alec Morrison |

NOTE: 2019-2020 ADASL Season and the Perrin Cup were ended early due to the COVID-19 outbreak.

=== Player records ===
NPSL Players of the Year

| Award | 2016 | 2017 | 2018 | 2019 | 2021 | 2022 | 2023 |
|---|---|---|---|---|---|---|---|
| MVP | (United States) Scott I. Redding | (United States) George Rodriguez | (Nigeria) Isaac Promise | (France) Toni Tiente | (England) Ollie Peters | (England) George Maxwell | (England) Callum Schorah |
| Attacker of the Year | (United States) Jarrel Smalls | (United States) Sam Choi | (Saint Kitts and Nevis) Ehjayson Henry | (United States) Jumar Oakley | (Israel) Sagi Hircsh | (England) Callum Schorah | (United States) Aaron Whitten |
| Defender of the Year | (United States) Adam McCabe | (Trinidad and Tobago) Marcelle Francois | (England) Jack Gurr | (Italy) Gianmaria Fiore | (England) Sam. Pollard | (England) George Maxwell | (England) Tom Wilson |
| Young Player of the Year | (United States) Bjorn Kammholz | (United States) Carson Oakes | (France) Toni Tiente | (France) Eduardo. Gomes | (England) Mason Tunbridge | (Austria) Sebastian Dopplehofer | (United States) Nathaniel Martinez |

All-Time Senior Team Statistical Leaders

| Stat | 1st | 2nd | 3rd | 4th | 5th | | |
|---|---|---|---|---|---|---|---|
| Appearances | Scott Redding - 79 | Aaron Whitten - 38 | Sagi Hircsh - 37 | Kwandwo Poku - 31 | Toni Tiente - 26 | | |
| Goals | Martin Saucedo - 16 | Kwandwo Poku - 14 | Aaron Whitten - 11 | Gustavo Atencio - 10 | Callum Schorah - 10 | Jumar Oakley - 7 | Isaac Promise - 7 |
| Assists | Craig Chisholm - 9 | T: Sagi Hircsh - 7 Aaron Whitten - 7 Callum Schorah - 7 | Jack Gurr - 5 | | | | |

== Stadium ==
- RYSA Soccerplex; Conyers, Georgia (2011–2016)
- N. Mt. Carmel Soccer Park; Hampton, Georgia (2017)
- Henry County High School; McDonough, Georgia (2018–2021)
- McDonough High School; McDonough, Georgia (2022–present)
