= Helen Lemme =

African-American civil rights activist (1904–1968)

- Born: Frances Helen Renfrow; February 25, 1904; Grinnell, Iowa, U.S.
- Died: December 15, 1968 (aged 64); Iowa City, Iowa, U.S.
- Occupation: Civil rights advocate
- Known for: Civil rights activism in Iowa
- Spouse: Alexander Lemme
- Parent(s): Lee Augustus Renfrow; Eva Craig

Helen Lemme (February 25, 1904 – December 15, 1968) was an African-American civil rights advocate who lived most of her life in Iowa City, Iowa.

== Life and career ==
Helen Lemme was born Frances Helen Renfrow to Eva Craig and Lee Augustus Renfrow in Grinnell, Iowa, on February 25, 1904. She was the oldest of six children and worked as a housekeeper to help her family financially. As a student she once won an essay contest but was not given the gold medal prize because of her race.

Lemme graduated from Grinnell High School, receiving a $5 gold coin scholarship. She began her university studies in 1923 at Fisk University in Nashville, Tennessee, but in 1925 moved to the University of Iowa, a state university, in Iowa City, where she studied science and biology and served as the president of the Delta Sigma Theta sorority.

Her first position after graduation was as a teacher at Lander College in Greenwood, South Carolina. After one year she returned to Iowa City and on August 26, 1929, she married Allyn Lemme. She then accepted a teaching position at Alabama State Teachers College located in Montgomery, Alabama, which later became Alabama State College for Negroes, and is now Alabama State University.

Lemme then returned to Iowa City with the intention of obtaining a master's degree but she was diverted and had a son, Lawrence, on July 31, 1931. She later had another son, Paul, in 1935.

The Lemmes used their Iowa City home at 603 S. Capitol Street to provide room and board to African-American students at University of Iowa, who were not allowed to live in dormitories until 1946. Duke Ellington once played at one of her all-night house parties.

Lemme devoted her life to the rights of African Americans and women, and she was an active member of the Democratic Party. She served as a precinct committeewoman, a delegate at state and county conventions, and member of the Democratic Party Black Caucus. She also advocated for greater representation of Black voters at the 1944 Democratic National Convention in Chicago. Locally, Lemme was involved in the Human Rights Commission and the Iowa City Area Council of Churches. She was elected President of the Iowa City League of Women Voters in 1946 and Iowa City Woman of the Year in 1955. A few years later, she was the first Black woman in Iowa City to be awarded the Best Citizen of the Year.

Along the way, Lemme began work as a laboratory research technician in the Department of Internal Medicine.

Lemme died on December 15, 1968, from smoke inhalation in a fire in her home.

== Legacy ==
In 1970, a new elementary school in Iowa City was named Helen Lemme Elementary School in her honor. In 1984, University of Iowa African-American graduate students founded the Helen Lemme Reading club, to serve as both a forum for African Americans to discuss literature by or about African Americans and a support group for African-American students living in a predominantly white community.

== External links and other sources ==
- A collection of photos of Helen Lemme's life, created by students at Helen Lemme Elementary School https://helenlemme.omeka.net/exhibits/show/helen-lemme-life
