= Stella Reid =

British nanny

- Born: 3 October 1964 (age 61); Burnley, Lancashire, England
- Occupation: Nanny
- Website: Official website

Stella Reid (born 3 October 1964) is an English nanny, author and television personality, known publicly as one of the stars of the reality television series Nanny 911. She is co-author of The Nanny Chronicles of Hollywood, Nanny 911: Expert Advice for All Your Parenting Emergencies and The Nanny in Charge.

== Early life ==
Reid was born in Burnley, Lancashire and attended Towneley High School and Habergham Sixth-form.

== Career ==
Reid moved to the United States in 1989, where she continues to work with families on a one-on-one basis by offering private consultations, as well as through her speaking engagements. She travels the country delivering parenting workshops.
