= Nanny 911 =

American reality television series

- Starring: Stella Reid; Deborah Carroll; Yvonne Shove; Yvonne Finnerty; Lilian Sperling; Craig McRae
- Country of origin: United States
- Original language: English
- No. of seasons: 4
- No. of episodes: 51

Production
- Executive producers: Paul Jackson; Bruce Toms
- Producers: Suzanne Ali; Karyn Benkendorfer; Stacey Dowdy Travis; Thomas Loureiro; Paulette Terry; Stacey Travis
- Running time: 42 minutes (edited versions are cut down to 37-39 minutes)
- Production company: Granada America

Original release
- Network: Fox (2004–07); CMT (2009); (United States); ITV2 (2005–2010); (United Kingdom)
- Release: November 3, 2004 – June 6, 2009

Related
- Supernanny; Little Angels

Nanny 911 is an American reality television series that originally aired on Fox from November 3, 2004, to February 23, 2007, and on CMT from April 18 to June 6, 2009.

== Premise ==
Nanny 911 is loosely based on the British television program Little Angels, in which American families with unmanageable children are reformed by British nannies.

The introduction shows montages of several clips of unruly children and the nannies' surprised reactions, whereupon stock footage shows a "call" being made to Nanny 911, where "Head Nanny Lilian" Sperling answers, "Hello, this is Nanny 911" on an old rotary dial phone.

After the introduction, the selected family is shown on a separate clip. Head Nanny Lilian and the other nannies – "Nanny Deb" (Deborah Carroll), "Nanny Stella" (Stella Reid), and "Nanny Yvonne" (originally Yvonne Shove, later Yvonne Finnerty) discuss the clip, whereupon Lilian announces, based on the major need and nanny specialty, which nanny will visit the family. The nannies are shown visiting the family in traditional nanny dress.

The nanny's first day is spent solely in observing the family dynamics to determine a suitable plan of action for changing the children's behavior; at the end of the day, the nanny discusses what needs to be done. The remainder of the week shows the plan being implemented, along with the parents' reactions, which can be quite negative. At the end of the week, the nanny generally compliments the family for the changed behavior. The last segment shows the family receiving a substantial gift from the nanny. After season two, the gift portion was removed.

In season four, Nanny Yvonne did not appear. In some episodes this season, the nanny observes for two days rather than one.

The series has drawn criticism for exploiting children on national TV for entertainment.

== Move to CMT ==
On February 27, 2008, Fox announced that it sold the rights to Nanny 911 (as well as its partnered Fox show, Trading Spouses) to CMT.

== Episodes ==
=== Series overview ===
Season	Episodes	Originally released	
Season	Episodes	First released	Last released
1	17	November 3, 2004	May 16, 2005
2	11	September 5, 2005	March 24, 2006
3	15	September 8, 2006	May 20, 2008
4	8	April 18, 2009	June 6, 2009

=== Season 1 (2004–05) ===
No. Overall	No. In Season	Title	Location	Airdate	Assigned Nanny	Prod. Code
1	1	"Rock Family"	Oak View, CA	November 3, 2004	Deborah Caroll	NAN-101
Matt and Karen Rock have two children: a 4-year-old son and 2-year-old daughter. The son runs the house with his tantrums, swearing, and destructive behavior. The daughter has picked up her brother's behavior. Both parents have marital issues, as they are not on the same page about discipline, and do not even sleep in the same bed together. The kids' behaviors have made for a chaotic household.
2	2	"McCray Family"	Old Bridge, NJ	November 10, 2004	Stella Reid	NAN-104
Craig and Tracy McCray have five sons: a 9-year-old, 6-year-old, 3-year-old, and 2-year-old twins. Both parents have totally different parenting styles. The oldest two are destructive and roughhouse constantly. The three youngest run around the house, throwing tantrums, and climbing the walls. Because Craig is away for long hours, he feels guilty, so he overindulges the kids to the point of going behind Tracy's back.
3	3	''McRoberts Family"	Indianapolis, IN	November 17, 2004	Deborah Carroll	NAN-106
Douglas and Dianna McRoberts have five sons: year-old triplets and 3-year-old twins. Doug and Dianna lose their tempers and shout at their boys who survive on junk food and candy, causing them to go on sugar-fueled rampages that consist of roughhousing, screaming, and misbehaving.
4	4	"Priore Family"	West Babylon, NY	December 1, 2004	Stella Reid	NAN-108
Nina and Joseph Priore have five children: 10-year-old daughter and 8-year-old quadruplets. The kids constantly yell and fight. Both parents are in a power struggle with a quadruplet who is the badly behaved child of the five. Joe has resorted to shouting and spanking, while Nina is depressed and concerned for the future of her chaotic family.
5	5	"Lorimor Family"	Jacksonville, NC	December 15, 2004	Stella Reid	NAN-107
Theron Lorimor and the former nanny Ginger have two children: a 4-year-old daughter and 3-year-old son. Theron is a Marine leaving Ginger to raise two defiant kids. The son is turning into a violent child and is often getting physical, while the daughter beats up on her brother behind the scenes. Ginger spoils the kids by giving them pacifiers and baby bottles. Theron is strict with the kids.
6	6	"Johnston Family"	Levittown, NY	December 22, 2004	Yvonne Shove	NAN-102
Scott and Kristen Johnston have seven daughters. Scott is an NYPD officer, but when he comes home, he prefers to watch tackle football. Kirsten is left dealing with her rowdy daughters and has no time for herself. She was also diagnosed with heart arrhythmia.
7	7	"Paul Family"	Ballwin, MO	January 5, 2005	Deborah Carroll	NAN-103
Tim and Cyndi Paul have four children. The kids scream, pull their hair, make messes, and create chaos. The house is mess, and Cyndi does not give the kids responsibility or rules.
8	8	"Sterneman Family"	Los Angeles, CA	January 12, 2005	Deborah Carroll	NAN-109
John and Roxanne Sterneman have three children. John works long hours, leaving Roxanne and three out-of-control kids. The oldest child has anger management issues and often explodes into foul-mouthed and violent rampages. The middle child locks herself in the bathroom to get away from her parents; when things do not go her way, she throws ear-splitting tantrums. The youngest has picked up on this stubborn behavior, she refuses to go potty, and is still in a diaper. Roxanne is at her wits' end and screams at the kids. She is often negative and nags constantly.
9	9	"Finch Family"	Brookfield, CT	March 14, 2005	Deborah Carroll	NAN-110
Paul and Deborah Finck have six children. The kids whine, cry, and scream constantly. Paul refuses to help Deborah.
10	10	"Cubbison Family"	San Diego, CA	March 21, 2005	Stella Reid	NAN-111
Amy and Neil Cubbison have three children. Neil has picked up a hobby called racing pigeons; he spends the whole day playing with the pigeons and never helps out Amy. Bedtime is another problem; the boys do not sleep in their own beds, usually with the dog, the kids, and mom and dad in the same bed.
11	11	"Dunleavy Family"	Mineola, NY	March 28, 2005	Deborah Carroll	NAN-112
Kevin and Denise Dunleavy have five children, one of whom has Down syndrome. The boys fight with one another constantly, and show no respect, which frustrates Denise. Repeated moves have been upsetting for the family; because of Kevin's home improvement business, the house is under construction, putting the kids' safety at risk. Denise and Kevin have poor communication skills, different parenting styles, and a lack of respect for each other, which is jeopardizing their marriage.
12	12	"Amico Family"	Irondequoit, NY	April 4, 2005	Nanny Deb	NAN-114
David and Dawn Amico have five children. With David busy running a family restaurant called Amico's Pizza and Dawn going back to school while being a stay-at-home mom, the kids are left fighting for attention. The kids spit, kick, throw things, pull hair, scream, and wrestle.
13	13	"McKelvain Family"	Ocoee, FL	April 11, 2005	Yvonne Shove	NAN-105
John and Stevi McKelvain have four children: 3 boys and 1 girl, all rowdy. Stevi is overrun by her four kids and housework; she has no time for herself. John does not often help out or discipline the kids, but when he does it, he resorts to physical punishment, spanking the kids.
14	14	"King Family"	Goshen, NY	April 18, 2005	Stella Reid	NAN-113
Chris and Laura King have five children aged from 1 to 7 years old, and nine pets. If Laura and Chris do not get their marriage under control, more damage will be done to their family.
15	15	"Lawrence Family"	Peachtree City, GA	May 2, 2005	Stella Reid	NAN-115
Jim and Tammy Lawrence have two sons: a 5-year-old and 4-year-old. The older son is very shy, while the younger whines constantly. Both boys are babied by their parents and drink from sippy cups. Jim and Tammy believe they have the perfect life, but at bedtime, the boys' refuse to sleep in their own beds; they scream and cry for hours, and get out of bed several times. Tammy believes that he is traumatized or afraid of something, so at the end of the day, Tammy, Jim, and the boys sleep in one big bed.
16	16	"Silcock Family Special"	Huntington Beach, CA	May 9, 2005	Deborah Carroll, Stella Reid and Yvonne Finnerty	NAN-118
Ann and Jim Silcock have 32 sons; 23 are in the house between ages 18 and 4. Most of the boys have ADHD, cerebral palsy, Down syndrome, PTSD, and autism, with one child (David) having a traumatic brain injury caused by child abuse. With a of mob disabled boys who cannot mind their manners, Ann has her hands full. Every day, she uses seven vans, several boxes of eggs, milk and other foods, and 36 loads of laundry, and schedules therapy sessions to help the boys with their special needs. Jim is also disabled due to a diving accident back in 1987; he is quadriplegic.
17	17	"Dickson Family"	San Diego, CA	May 16, 2005	Deborah Carroll	NAN-116
Kirsten Dickson has two children: an 8-year-old daughter, and 7-year-old son. Kirsten's husband, Clay, had died a year ago from a car accident. Ever since Clay's death, the kids fight, swear, kick, punch, and exhibit destructive behavior; Kirsten has lost control of her household.

NOTE: The King Family was also featured on the spin-off Marriage 911 to help their marriage.

=== Season 2 (2005–06) ===
No. Overall	No. In Season	Title	Location	Airdate	Assigned Nanny	Prod. Code
18	1	"Tieso Family"	Franklin, MA	September 5, 2005	Deborah Carroll	NAN-201
Joe and Andrea Tieso have three children: 7-year-old twins and a 3-year-old. The boys are aggressive and throw extreme tantrums that drive their mother crazy. One acts out, because he feels unloved by Andrea, and is jealous of his brother. Another is ignored by her parents, because she doesn't cause any trouble. Joe undermines Andrea constantly leaving the kids to do whatever they want.
19	2	"Abner Family"	Carlisle, OH	September 28, 2005	Deborah Carroll	NAN-204
Dennis and Michelle Abner have five children. Dennis is often putting the children in danger by putting them on Three-wheelers without helmets, allowing them to play in the street, and play with fire. Bridget, Rachel & Heidi roughhouse and disrespect Michelle. The kids have no respect for Dennis and Michelle, and think of her as a nerd, a party pooper, and a geek.
20	3	"Race Family"	Grover, MO	October 5, 2005	Stella Reid	NAN-205
Tracy and Kevin Race have four children. The children show no respect towards Tracy and talk back, spit, kick, bite, scream, and curse. The children have no manners and are spoiled. When Kevin walks through the door, the kids behave and respond because they’re afraid of him knowing he used to yell and spank; Kevin's anger not only affects the children, but Tracy too.
21	4	"Maucione Family"	Pearl River, NY	December 5, 2005	Yvonne Finnerty	NAN-202
Mike and Dawn Maucione have three children: a 5-year-old son and 3-year-old identical twin daughters. The son lies and is treated differently from the twins. Bedtime is a disaster, because the kids have excuses to be out of bed. Both parents want their children to grow up, but they have some growing up to do themselves. Mike is childish and bullies his son, leaving Dawn to run the house and the kids, which stresses her out causing her to scream at the kids.
22	5	"Nannis Family"	Duluth, GA	December 12, 2005	Yvonne Finnerty	NAN-203
Brian and Amy Nannis have six children. The kids are loud and unruly and the tantrums are endless. Amy is tired of taking care of her six children and has checked out, making the oldest child become a mini mom. Brian works from morning to evening, and when he comes home, he'll try to tolerate the chaos for as long as he can, and when he can't take it any more, he'll rush out of the house for choir practice at his church.
23	6	"Spaulding Family'	Evansville, IN	December 19, 2005	Deborah Carroll	NAN-206
Brent and Vicki Spaulding have six sons, one of whom has Spina bifida, and is more aware of his condition. This has made him feel left out and insecure. In an attempt to shelter the kids, Vicki homeschools the boys, but it disintegrates into chaos as the boys fight amongst themselves, and struggle to focus. When Brent comes home from work, he roughhouses with the kids leaving Vicki to do everything. At bedtime, Brent lays with each son until they go to sleep due to his lonely and fatherless childhood, because of this, the boys fear being alone.
24	7	"Moore Family"	Temecula, CA	January 4, 2006	Stella Reid	NAN-207
Darrell and Barbara Moore have five children. The kids are constantly screaming across the house, fighting amongst themselves, and disrespect and defy Barbara and refuse to clean up after themselves. Barbara has no control over the kids while Darryl is lazy, judgemental, and doesn't understand his family mainly his wife and daughters
25	8	"Graham Family"	Lemont, IL	January 11, 2006	Deborah Carroll	NAN-208
Steve and Jeanine Graham have four sons. Both parents are busy with their respective jobs, so they allow the boys to play violent video games that involve killing and shooting, This only causes the boys to be violent towards each other, and cause serious injuries to each other. They have given each other black eyes, and stitches, and have even cracked each other's heads open. Since one is a middle child he feels left out and feels like he gets no attention.
26	9	"Delaney Family"	Islip Terrace, NY	March 10, 2006	Yvonne Finnerty	NAN-210
Kerry and Janice Delaney have two daughters. The family also has a Vietnamese Pot-bellied pig, Mickey, who is 7 years old. There is no schedule for anyone but the pig, which has distracted Janice from being a parent to her girls. She allows the pig to bite the girls. Kerry has to deal with the girls, The whole family sleeps in one big bed to Kerry's dismay. The house is untidy, unsafe and a disaster.
27	10	"George Family"	Quincy, MA	March 17, 2006	Deborah Carroll	NAN-211
Jeffrey and Teresa George have three children. Jeffrey is a stay-at-home dad while Teresa goes to work, but things are changing, Jeffrey is going back to work and Teresa is becoming a stay-at-home mom. The kids aren't handling the change too well, They whine constantly, refuse to share, and behave in a wild manner. Teresa practically spoils the kids by giving them whatever they want, and loading them up with sugary treats like cookies, soda, cupcakes, popsicles, ice cream, donuts, etc. When Jeffrey is around the kids are good because he actually disciplines them.
28	11	"Longairc-Green Family"	Rochester Hills, MI	March 24, 2006	Stella Reid	NAN-209
Adam Longaric and Michelle Green have three children who are all from Michelle's first marriage. The kids have no respect for anyone or anything, swear, spit, misbehave, and are sassy. Michelle is usually lazy, and lets Adam handle everything, but when he tries to discipline the kids he's disrespected and denied because he's the stepfather. Michelle remains stubborn throughout the episode thus causing Nanny Stella to fail on Michelle, but stay to help Adam and the kids.

NOTE: Episodes 12 and 13 are also Season 2 but were added to Season 3.

=== Season 3 (2006–08) ===
No.Overall	No. in Season	Title	Location	Airdate	Assigned Nanny	Prod. Code
29	1	"Morris Family"	Marietta, GA	September 8, 2006	Stella Reid	NAN-212
Craig and Heidi Morris have three children. The oldest throws tantrums when things don't go his way. He also has difficulty sharing his toys. Another child is starting to take after his behavior, and the two of them get into fights about sharing. Heidi has no idea how to deal with them she often gives into tantrums. Craig works long hours, when he comes home he ignores his family and heads for the laptop or the phone, leaving Heidi stressed, upset, and desperate for help.
30	2	"Scharnitzky Family"	San Diego, CA	September 15, 2006	Stella Reid	NAN-213
Jason and Jennifer Scharnitzky have three children: Jason is in the Marines, and has returned from serving for Operation Iraqi Freedom. All three children throw tantrums frequently and deal with anger. Bedtime is an issue, as one child throws tantrums and will use every excuse in the book to stay out of bed because he fears that Dad won't be there when they wake up because he's deployed overseas for long periods of time.
31	3	"Arilotta Family"	Rochester, NY	September 22, 2006	Deborah Carroll	NAN-302
Chris and Kammy Arilotta have a set of 5-year-old triplet boys. Both parents tag-team when it comes to work. When Kammy is home, she struggles with the boys constantly and nags, and when Chris is home he plays around and roughhouses with the boys, which only increases their wild behavior. Two of them mock, disobey, and assault their parents regularly.
32	4	"Giannetto Family"	Centereach, NY	October 6, 2006	Yvonne Finnerty	NAN-303
Tony and Kelly Giannetto have six children:. The five younger kids scream, swear and run amok. Kelly is at the end of her rope and responds by screaming and blowing up, which causes conflict between her and the kids especially Gianna and Anthony. Tony just tunes the kids out, and doesn't know how to deal with them.
33	5	"Elgin Family"	Tacoma, WA	October 6, 2006	Stella Reid	NAN-301
Rich and Suzy Elgin have three children. The oldest is defiant, foul-mouthed, verbally harasses her parents, and she often throws long-day tantrums. The middle child is angry and aggressive, while the youngest is following her siblings’ footsteps. Suzy is often left with the kids because Rich goes out mountain biking or working.
34	6	"McCafferty Family"	Staten Island, NY	January 5, 2007	Stella Reid	NAN-304
Sean and Siobhan McCafferty have six children. Siobhan works in the NYPD and treats her children like prisoners, yelling at them, berating them, and using the "F" word out of frustration. She shows no affection. The kids are noisy, and unruly and tantrums are endless. Mary has a loud scream when she's angry. Her son feels left out, and is crying and complaining to get attention.
35	7	"Landsberger Family"	St. Michael, MN	January 12, 2007	Yvonne Finnerty	NAN-305
Bob and Melissa Landsberger have three daughters. Melissa is constantly nitpicking, and belittling at her children and husband. Courtney is argumentative and feels as if she's treated differently from her younger sisters; she doesn't see eye to eye with her mother, which causes the child to run away. The middle child bothers the oldest and barges into her room. Bob is uninvolved and oblivious which frustrates Melissa.
36	8	"Walker Family"	Albertville, MN	January 19, 2007	Deborah Carroll	NAN-306
Jim and Nikki Walker have two children. One is defiant and verbally harasses her mother, while the other is hyperactive and violent. Nikki prefers to be a friend and undermines Jim's efforts to set boundaries. Because of this, Jim reads his newspapers while the kids run the house.
37	9	"McDowell Family"	New City, NY	January 26, 2007	Deborah Carroll	NAN-307
Kevin and Eileen McDowell have three sons. The oldest enjoys joking around, but often takes it too far to the point of bullying. The youngest talks back and sleeps with his parents, if he doesn't sleep with his parent, he'll have a long meltdown. Eileen and Kevin differ in parenting styles. Kevin roughhouses with the boys and thinks that they don't need discipline or chores. Because of Kevin's leniency, things get destroyed and the boys get hurt which frustrates Eileen; as a result, she's become an unlikeable nag and is in competition with the oldest child.
38	10	"Dirks Family"	Glendale, AZ	February 2, 2007	Stella Reid	NAN-308
Paul and Amber Dirks have two children. Both parents are busy working (a software engineer and vocalizer respectively) so in an attempt to distract them, Paul and Amber have gave their children a large capacity of toys. The toys have not distracted the children and has left them looking for attention. One child is violent and stubborn, his behavior has gotten him booted out of preschool. The other child has anger management, and turns her aggression on her parents.
39	11	"Brogdon Family"	Gastonia, NC	February 9, 2007	Deborah Carroll	NAN-309
David and Angela Brogdon have a set of 4-year-old triplets. Two of them have horrible tempers, and struggle with sharing. The other gets into fights with his siblings and whines. The triplets give their father more respect than their mother.
40	12	"Mills Family"	Orlando, FL	February 16, 2007	Yvonne Finnerty	NAN-310
Kenneth and Jennifer Mills have four children. The oldest is on his elementary school's football team, and constantly pile-drives and attacks his mom and sister. The next oldest is difficult to deal with, and refuses to brush his teeth or go to sleep without a fight. The third has no respect for Jennifer and sits around watching sports, calling Jennifer a b****, and demanding bottles of beer and food. He also doesn't handle any fighting with the kids. The youngest often copies this behavior.
41	13	"Kramer Family"	Cedar Rapids, IA	February 23, 2007	Stella Reid	NAN-311
Ted and Jessica Kramer have four children, including a baby. Because both parents are busy tending to the baby and working, the boys have taken over the house they talk-back, scream, throw tantrums to get their way, and often leave the house and play near the busy highway. By the end of the day, Ted is exhausted and looking for the easy way out so for bedtime he puts the boys in the minivan and drives them around until they sleep. On December 26, 2008, Ted and his oldest child were crossing the highway to go sledding, when Brevin was hit by a pickup truck and died in the hospital a day later. The weather conditions were to blame and the man behind the pickup was not charged.
42	14	"Keffer Family"	Richmond, VA	May 15, 2008	Deborah Carroll	NAN-312
Chris and Camille Keffer have two children. Camille is a perfectionist and appears to show no emotion to anyone, she incessantly criticizes her children. Chris is a pushover and finds it easier to let the kids have whatever they want. Due to this, the older child is confused and has a bad temper, she screams, growls, cries, and feels as if she has to please her mother and has also become a perfectionist. The younger child copies, the older child's behavior.
43	15	"Hanley Family"	Hernando, FL	May 20, 2008	Stella Reid	NAN-313
James and Alice Hanley have three children: a son and 2 daughters. The son has complete dictatorship over the household, if he loses in a game or doesn't get his way, he'll assault his sisters and break things. The sisters have issues with sharing and also give their parents a hard time. Jim doesn't want to be a disciplinarian, and wants to be the kids friend, so he allows them to walk all over him, Alice wants to discipline her children but doesn't know how to so the two of them end up clashing about it.

NOTE: Episode 14 and 15 were previously unaired episodes that premiered during CMT's reruns of the show.

=== Season 4 (2009) ===
No. Overall	No. In Season	Title	Location	Airdate	Assigned Nanny	Prod. Code
44	1	"The Mazzei Family"	Smithtown, NY	April 18, 2009	Deborah Caroll	NAN-401
Marc and Jackie Mazzei have a set of 4-year-old twins who scream and cry at every inconvenience. One fights and argues until he gets his way. Jackie bribes the kids with junk food and sweets to calm them down. The twins aren't potty trained yet, and are still in diapers which frustrates Marc.
45	2	"The Balsamo Family"	Staten Island, NY	April 25, 2009	Stella Reid	NAN-404
Sergio and Elaine Balsamo have three children. The kids are running a dictatorship; they break things, swear, yell and run around the house. The older kids are on the verge of becoming juvenile delinquents, one threatens to kill the other for money and assaults his parents. The other lies, steals money from her mother and refuses to go to bed at night. Sergio and Elaine are brought to tears as they think they're kids disrespect towards them.
46	3	''Connolly Family"	Mineola, NY	May 2, 2009	Deborah Carroll	NAN-405
Eric and Kelly Connolly have three children. While Eric is in the Army, he is deployed overseas and Kelly stays home with her three young children under the age of 5. The middle child is the ringleader of the brood, as she throws tantrums, kicks, defies Kelly, spits, snots, and makes death threats, while the oldest is very emotional and moody. Both girls still use bottles. Kelly is so stressed out that she allows the children to walk all over her.
47	4	"O'Melia Family"	Kings Park, NY	May 9, 2009	Stella Reid	NAN-402
Jim and Judy O'Melia have 5 children. Staying with the kids at home all day has taken a toll on Judy, she's so stressed out that she allows bad behavior to go unchecked. One child is violent, rude and stubborn. Timeout takes an hour with him. His behavior is filtering down to his three younger brothers, they are very loud, rude, and destructive. Jim gets more respect from the children because he is consistent and follows through.
48	5	"Valenti Family"	Northport, NY	May 16, 2009	Deborah Carroll	NAN-403
Nicholas and Deborah Valenti have three children. The two eldest boys constantly cry, scream, fight, jumping around, and are getting hurt.
49	6	"Whipple Family"	Morris, CT	May 23, 2009	Stella Reid	NAN-406
Robert and Linda Whipple have five children.
50	7	"Mauro Family"	Wappinger Falls, NY	May 30, 2009	Deborah Carroll	NAN-407
Ed and Kara Mauro have three children.
51	8	"Henry Family"	Queens, NY	June 6, 2009	Stella Reid	NAN-408
Mike and Allison Henry have three children.

== See also ==
- Supernanny
