= High Sheriff of the West Midlands =

Ceremonial officer of West Midlands, England

The Office of High Sheriff of the West Midlands is the ceremonial position of high sheriff appointed to the West Midlands, a metropolitan county in central England. The appointment is made by the British monarch by Pricking the Lists. Created in 1974, the office of High Sheriff of the West Midlands has the duty to "protect and assist in upholding the dignity and well being of His Majesty’s judges and to represent the King's executive powers in respect of the administration of justice in the county". The office of high sheriff is normally awarded to people of stature in the West Midlands who have significantly and positively contributed in some way to the county's community either through voluntary work or through commerce or industry.

== List of high sheriffs ==
- 1974–1975: Michael Hotham Cadbury, of Selly Oak, Birmingham
- 1975–1976: Edwin Hardwick Moore, of Ashfurlong Hall, Sutton Coldfield
- 1976–1977: Lt.-Colonel John Henry Coldwell Horsfall, of Home Farm, Leek Wootton
- 1977–1978: Michael Gary Southall, of Harborne, Birmingham
- 1978–1979: Lt.-Colonel Lawrence Willoughby Wilson, of Barlows Road, Edgbaston
- 1979–1980: Anthony Reginald Wyldbore-Smith, of Elmcroft, Berkswell
- 1980–1981: David Williams-Thomas, of The Manor House, Birlingham, Pershore
- 1981–1982: David Gwyn Justham, of Edgbaston, Birmingham
- 1982–1983: Anthony Frederic Birtles, Cutlers Farm, Wootton Wawen
- 1983–1984: Hugh Kenrick, of Farquhar Road, Edgbaston
- 1984–1985: Derek Montague Percy Lea, of Rosedale, Moseley
- 1985–1986: Richard Leslie Harris, of Oldswinford, Stourbridge
- 1986–1987: William Eric Husselby, of Fen End House, Kenilworth
- 1987–1988: Patrick William Welch, of Wellington Road, Edgbaston
- 1988–1989: Francis Charles Graves, of Aldersyde, Tanworth-in-Arden
- 1989–1990: David John Crump Johnson of Shenstone, Kidderminster
- 1990–1991: David Lovell Burbidge
- 1991–1992: Bruce Winton Tanner of Moseley, Birmingham
- 1992–1993: John Anthony Jefferson
- 1993–1994: John Ian Westwood
- 1994–1995: Sir George Adrian Hayhurst Cadbury, of Knowle, Solihull
- 1995–1996: Professor Sir Frederick William Crawford of Arthur Road, Edgbaston
- 1996–1997: John David Saville
- 1997–1998: Edward Michael Worley
- 1998–1999: William George Key Carter of Elmey Lovett, Droitwich
- 1999–2000: Roger Stephen Burman
- 2000–2001: Jeremy Frederick Woolridge
- 2001–2002: Tessa King-Farlow of Edgbaston, Birmingham
- 2002–2003: Gary James Allen
- 2003–2004: Michael Evans
- 2004–2005: John Leslie Andrews
- 2005–2006: Roger Joseph Dickens
- 2006–2007: John Rawcliffe Airey Crabtree
- 2007–2008: Robert Peter Tomlinson
- 2008–2009: Byron Head of Barnt Green
- 2009–2010: Paul Bassi of Stourbridge
- 2010–2011: Anita Kumari Bhalla of Handsworth Wood
- 2011–2012: David L Grove of Henley in Arden
- 2012–2013: Stewart Towe of Smethwick
- 2013–2014: Dame Christine Braddock of Birmingham
- 2014–2015: Dr Tim Watts
- 2015–2016: Jonnie Turpie
- 2016–2017: Dr Keith Bradshaw
- 2017–2018: John L. Hudson
- 2018–2019: Christopher Thomas Loughran
- 2019–2020: Michael Kuo of Edgbaston, Birmingham
- 2020–2021: Wade Cleone Lyn, of Birmingham selected but incapacitated by Covid. Duties performed by Michael Kuo
- 2021–2022: Louise Diane Bennett
- 2022–2023: David Robert Moorcroft,
- 2023–2024: Wade Cleone Lyn, of Birmingham
- 2024–2025: Douglas Robertson Wright, of Aldridge
- 2025–2026: Mark Lyndon Smith, of Sutton Coldfield
- 2026–2027: Carmen Anne Watson, of Wolverhampton
