= Lander Bearcats =

Athletic teams of Lander University, South Carolina, U.S.

- University: Lander University
- Nickname: Bearcats
- NCAA: Division II
- Conference: Peach Belt (primary); Gulf South (women's lacrosse); Southern Rugby (men's rugby); Conference Carolinas (acrobatics & tumbling, wrestling); South Atlantic (field hockey)
- Athletic director: Brian Reese
- Location: Greenwood, South Carolina
- First season: 1968
- Varsity teams: 26 (10 men's, 14 women's, 2 co-ed)
- Basketball arena: Finis Horne Arena
- Baseball stadium: Stephen B. Dolny Stadium
- Softball stadium: Doug Spears Field
- Soccer stadium: Van Taylor Stadium
- Lacrosse stadium: Van Taylor Stadium
- Tennis venue: Joe Cabri Tennis Center
- Colors: Blue and yellow
- Website: landerbearcats.com

Team NCAA championships
- 8

Individual and relay NCAA champions
- 4

The Lander Bearcats are the athletic teams that represent Lander University, located in Greenwood, South Carolina, in intercollegiate sports at the Division II ranks of the National Collegiate Athletic Association (NCAA), primarily competing in the Peach Belt Conference (PBC) for 14 of their current varsity sports since the 1990–91 academic year.

The Bearcats have won 26 PBC Tournament championships while winning or sharing 36 regular-season titles.

Women's lacrosse plays in the Gulf South Conference, while men's rugby is part of the Southern Rugby Conference. The acrobatics & tumbling and wrestling teams compete in Conference Carolinas and the field hockey program is part of South Atlantic Conference.

Lander's major rival is Erskine, a fellow NCAA Division II institution whose campus is located 19 miles (31 km) away. Within the Peach Belt, Lander enjoys a rivalry with USC Aiken, the PBC member closest in proximity.

== Conference affiliations ==
- NAIA
  - NAIA Independent – 1968–69 to 1989–90
- NCAA Division II
  - Peach Belt Conference – 1990–91 to Present

== Sponsored sports ==
Men's sports	Women's sports
Baseball	Acrobatics and tumbling
Basketball	Basketball
Cross country	Cross country
Golf	Field hockey
Lacrosse	Golf
Rugby	Lacrosse
Soccer	Rugby
Tennis	Soccer
Track and field	Softball
Wrestling	Tennis
	Track and field
	Volleyball
Co-ed sports
Bass Fishing
esports

== Individual teams ==
=== Acrobatics and tumbling ===
Lander announced the addition acrobatics & tumbling on November 15, 2019. The Bearcats became the 32nd member of the National Collegiate Acrobatics and Tumbling Association (NCATA). Lander hired former Glenville State standout Sarah DiSpaltro as the program's first head coach. Lander participated in a limited competition schedule in 2020–21, with a full schedule beginning in 2021–22.

=== Baseball ===
Lander's baseball program reached the NCAA Tournament for the first time in 2012 and reached the NCAA Division II College World Series in 2014 and 2016. The 2014 squad won the program's first Peach Belt Conference regular-season and tournament titles, setting a school record with 52 wins. In 2016, the Bearcats advanced to the semifinals of the CWS and ended the season ranked No. 3, the highest final ranking in program history. In 2024, the team won their second Peach Belt Conference Regular Season Title in the program's history. In November 2018, Lander's baseball team hosted the first Banana Ball history against the Savannah Bananas.

=== Men's basketball ===
The Lander men's basketball program began in 1968, making it Lander's oldest athletic program. In 1999, Lander became the first Peach Belt Conference men's basketball team to ever advance to the NCAA Division II Elite Eight, beating Winston-Salem State 47–46 in the Southeast Regional championship. The Bearcats have won five PBC Tournament titles (1994, 1995, 2007, 2016, 2020) and were the first PBC team to repeat as tournament championships. In 2026, the men's basketball team reached the Division II final's game for the first time in their men's basketball program history, playing against Gannon University, where they ended up losing 61 to 84.

=== Women's basketball ===
The Lander women's basketball team has won or shared six Peach Belt Conference regular-season titles and has claimed five PBC Tournament championships. The Bearcats made the 2012 NCAA Division II Elite Eight with a 66–62 victory over Wingate in the Southeast Regional title game and advanced to the 2021 NCAA Division II national semifinals, the deepest postseason run in program history. Lander has advanced to 15 NCAA Tournaments in program history, including 12 of the last 14, and earned a No. 1 seed in the tournament in 2010 and 2020.

=== Cheer ===
Lander's cheerleading team won the 2019 Peach Belt Conference Spirit Competition. The Bearcats finished eighth in the Intermediate Division II competition at the 2018 NCA Collegiate Cheer Championship and placed seventh in 2019 for its third consecutive top-eight finish.

=== Men's cross country ===
The Lander men's cross country program returned in 2017 after a 17-year hiatus. At the first Peach Belt Conference Championships in 1991, Lander placed second. Three Lander runners have earned all-conference honors, including Timmy Harris, who became Lander's first two-time all-Peach Belt Belt Conference runner in 1998 and 1999.

=== Women's cross country ===
Lander women's cross country won each of the first three Peach Belt Conference Championships in 1991, 1992, and 1993. The 1991 team made history by earning first, second, and third individually at the PBC Championship, making Lander the only women's team in PBC history to take the top-three spots at the conference championship.

=== Dance ===
The Lander "Sassy Cats" dance team has won six PBC championships, winning the conference's Spirit Competition in 2012 and 2014 before capturing four consecutive titles from 2017 to 2020. The "Sassy Cats" made back-to-back trip to the Dance Team Union College Classic finals in 2018 and 2019, finishing fourth in the Open Team Performance competition both years.

=== Men's golf ===
The Bearcats have earned seven bids to the NCAA Division II Men's Golf Tournament. In 2007, Lander made the Southeast Regional for the first time in program history and advanced to the national championships, finishing 14th. Lander returned to the regional in 2008, 2009, and 2010. The Bearcats made three consecutive appearances in the postseason again from 2016 to 2018.

=== Women's golf ===
In 2013, Lander won its first Peach Belt Conference golf championship, shooting a 611 over two days to win the event by nine strokes. During the 2012–13 season, Teresa Caballer Hernani set a conference record that still stands today with a 73.50 stroke average. Lander's team stroke average of 308.00 also set a conference record at the time. The program was halted during the fall of 2015, but returned in the fall of 2018.

=== Men's lacrosse ===
Lander added men's and women's lacrosse on May 22, 2018. Anthony LePore, a former associate head coach and offensive coordinator at Belmont Abbey, was hired as the men's program's first head coach on July 2, 2018. The Bearcats earned their first win with a 14–13 victory over Emmanuel on February 12, 2020. Lander went 4-2 before the season was halted due to the COVID-19 outbreak and followed with a 6–5 record in 2021.

=== Women's lacrosse ===
Lander added men's and women's lacrosse on May 22, 2018. Former Presbyterian head coach Bob Dachille was hired on July 2, 2018, as the program's first head coach. Lander became a member of the Gulf South Conference on January 28, 2019. In the program's first-ever match on February 1, 2020, Lander defeated Newberry 13–12 in overtime.

=== Rugby ===
On January 14, 2019, Lander announced the addition of the university's club rugby program to the athletic department. Buck Billings was introduced as the head coach for the men's and women's teams. The men's team won the 2019 Southern Rugby Conference championship with a 43–16 victory over Elon and advanced to the Mid-Atlantic South Region Champions Cup.

=== Men's soccer ===
Lander has advanced to the NCAA Division II Men's Soccer Tournament 13 times in program history, winning three Southeast Regional championships (2001, 2005, 2018). Lander has won a share of 10 Peach Belt Conference regular-season title and five PBC Tournament championships. Lander's 16 appearances in the PBC Tournament championship are the most in conference history.

=== Women's soccer ===
The women's soccer program reached the NCAA Division II Women's Soccer Tournament for the first time in 2018, earning the No. 3 seed in the Southeast Regional. Lander has played in 18 Peach Belt Conference Tournaments in 20 years. In 2004, Katherine Duncan set a Peach Belt Conference record with 439 career saves, breaking the old record by 44. Chris Ayer was named the PBC Coach of the Year in 2007 and 2012.

=== Softball ===
Lander's softball program began in 1982 and played in the NAIA. Lander set a program record for wins and winning percentage in 1987, going 46–7. As a member of the PBC, Lander has made 18 PBC Tournaments and reached the tournament championship game in just its second season in the conference in 1993. The 1994 team set a Peach Belt record with a .363 batting average, a record that still stands today.

=== Men's tennis ===
The Lander men's tennis program has won 12 national championships, including eight in a row from 1993 to 2000, setting the NCAA men's tennis record for consecutive titles. Lander also captured four NAIA national titles and earned back-to-back championships in 1991–92, giving the program 10 straight national championships from 1991 to 2000. Since joining the NCAA in 1992–93, Lander has missed the NCAA Tournament just once.

=== Women's tennis ===
The Lander women's tennis began in 1976-77 and joined the NCAA Division II ranks in 1992–93. In 1999, Sandra Mitrovic was named the Peach Belt Conference Player of the Year. Lander did not field a team from 2001 to 2006, but brought the program back for the 2007 season. The 2014 team won 14 matches, an NCAA-era record for the program.

=== Volleyball ===
Lander's volleyball program has advanced to the NCAA Division II women's volleyball tournament four times, making the field in 2008, 2015, 2016, and 2018. In 2007, the Bearcats made their first appearance in the Peach Belt Conference Tournament championship match. The 2015 team set a program record with 25 wins and earned Lander's first win ever at the NCAA Tournament.

=== Field Hockey ===
Lander added Field Hockey as its 21st varsity sport on October 6th, 2021 and announced North Carolina Assistant Coach, Robbert Schenk as the program's first head coach. In their first season in 2022, the Bearcats went 9-8 and earned a spot in the South Atlantic Conference tournament and earned their first postseason win with a 1-0 win over Belmont Abbey. The second season of competition was a historical one that saw Lander finish the season with 13 wins, earn the first win over a nationally ranked team, and finish the season by winning the South Atlantic Conference Tournament championship with a 2-1 overtime win over the Limestone Saints.

=== Wrestling ===
Lander added wrestling to its athletic department on May 29, 2018. On July 2, 2018, Newberry associate head coach RC LaHaye was hired as the program's first head coach. The program notched its first win ever on December 11, 2019, with a 41–13 victory over Truett-McConnell. In the program's second season, Lander finished second in the South Atlantic Conference Carolinas standings and placed two wrestlers in the NCAA Division II National Championship field. Darius Parker was named the 2021 SACC Wrestler of The Year. 2022 saw the Bearcats finish first in the South Atlantic Conference Carolina for its first conference championship in just its third year as a program. Zeth Brower was named the SACC Wrestler of The Year while Elijah Lusk was named Freshman of The Year. The Bearcats had four national qualifiers while Zeth Brower became the first Bearcat wrestler to be named an All-American and National Champion. In 2023, Lander won their second straight SACC title while also earning their first-ever NCAA Super Region II Title and finished as National Runners-Up behind Central Oklahoma. Lander earned their third straight conference title, this time under the Conference Carolinas Monicre, beating UNC Pembroke, 29-9, in the Championship Match. The Bearcats then earned their second straight Super Region II title and finished as Runners-Up again at the 2024 NCAA Division II Wrestling Championship. During the tournament, sophomore David Hunsberger became the second Bearcat to win a national title, winning the 165-lb weight class.

== National championships ==
Sport	Association	Division	Year	Runner-up	Score
Men's Tennis (12)	NAIA (4)	Single	1985	Flagler	33
Men's Tennis (12)	NAIA (4)	Single	1988	Texas-Tyler	33
Men's Tennis (12)	NAIA (4)	Single	1991	BYU-Hawaii/West Florida	35
Men's Tennis (12)	NAIA (4)	Single	1992	BYU-Hawaii	31
Men's Tennis (12)	NCAA (8)	Division II	1993	Hampton	5–2
Men's Tennis (12)	NCAA (8)	Division II	1994	Hampton	5–3
Men's Tennis (12)	NCAA (8)	Division II	1995	North Florida	4–2
Men's Tennis (12)	NCAA (8)	Division II	1996	Rollins	4–1
Men's Tennis (12)	NCAA (8)	Division II	1997	West Florida	5–1
Men's Tennis (12)	NCAA (8)	Division II	1998	Barry	5–1
Men's Tennis (12)	NCAA (8)	Division II	1999	Barry	5–1
Men's Tennis (12)	NCAA (8)	Division II	2000	Hawaii Pacific	5–2

== Team name ==
When the Lander men's basketball program was formed in 1968, the team was referred to as the "Senators" because the Greenwood area had produced multiple statesmen. Lander's early women's teams were unofficially known as the "Reps." Lander's athletic teams would be primarily known as the "Senators" until 2003, when Lander officially changed its athletic nickname to the "Bearcats."

== Notable alumni ==
=== Men's soccer ===
- Luke Jordan
- Stephen Magennis
- Tom Marriott
- Jordan Skelton

=== Baseball ===
- Fraser Ellard
