= 2025 Carolina Core FC season =

Carolina Core FC
2025 season
- Owner: Megan Oglesby; Matt Penley; Mark Penley
- General manager: Eddie Pope
- Head coach: Donovan Ricketts
- Stadium: Truist Point
- MLS Next Pro: Eastern Conference: Overall:
- MLSNP Cup Playoffs: Conference Quarterfinals
- 2025 U.S. Open Cup: Second Round
- Top goalscorer: League: (Argentina) Facundo Canete (9 Goals); All: (Argentina) Facundo Canete (10 Goals)
- Highest home attendance: 4,774 vs Orlando City B September 27
- Lowest home attendance: 2,992 vs Philadelphia Union II July 30, 2,511 vs Soda City FC March 20 (US Open Cup)
- Average home league attendance: 3,994; All: 3,895
- Biggest win: Carolina Core FC 5–0 NYCFC II April 5
- Biggest defeat: Carolina Core FC 1–4 Chattanooga FC April 13
Home colors	Away colors

The 2025 Carolina Core FC Season is the club's second season in existence. This is the second independent club to play in a MLS Next Pro season alongside Chattanooga FC and will be joined by one other team in 2026. The club is located in North Carolina, US.

== Players and staff ==
=== Current roster ===
As of April 11, 2026

No.	Pos.	Nation	Player
0	GK	USA	Alex Sutton
1	GK	USA	Andrew Pannenberg
2	DF	USA	Daniel Chica
3	MF	JAM	Zion Scarlett
4	DF	USA	Kai Thomas
6	DF	ARG	Juan Pablo Rodriguez
7	FW	USA	Yekeson Subah
8	FW	ANT	Drake Hadeed
10	DF	ENG	Jacob Evans
11	FW	LBR	Anthony Sumo Jr.
12	MF	TAN	Alenga Charles
13	FW	HON	Josuha Rodriguez
14	DF	USA	Jathan Juarez
15	FW	COL	David Polanco
16	MF	USA	Corey Lundeen
17	MF	IRL	Glory Nzingo
19	MF	COL	Mateo Sarmiento
20	DF	FRA	Ibrahim Covi
21	MF	DOM	Derek Cuevas
22	FW	USA	Jesus Ibarra
24	MF	ARG	Facundo Canete
26	MF	FRA	Paul Baptiste Behe Leonardi
28	FW	ARG	Federico Stachuk
29	MF	COL	Santiago Cambindo
31	GK	USA	Robert Bailey
44	DF	USA	Christian Diaz
77	MF	CHI	Jonathan Bazaes
99	MF	LBR	Aryeh Miller

=== Staff ===
- Eddie Pope – Chief Sporting Officer
- Donovan Ricketts – Head Coach
- Amado Guevara – Assistant Coach
- Vacant – Goalkeeping Coach
- Robert Ritchie – Director Of Soccer Operations

== Transfers ==
=== In ===
Date	Position	Number	Name	from	Type	Fee	Ref.
December 31, 2024	FW	23	(United States) Tyler Freeman	(United States) Hartford Athletic	end of loan	NA	
December 31, 2024	FW	28	(Argentina) Federico Stachuk	(United States) Greenville Triumph SC	end of loan	NA	
January 14, 2025	DF	3	(Jamaica) Zion Scarlett	(United States) Greenville Triumph SC	Signing	Free	
March 6, 2025	MF	19	(Colombia) Mateo Sarmiento	(United States) Inter Miami CF Academy	Signing	Free	
March 7, 2025	FW	11	(Liberia) Anthony Sumo Jr.	(United States) Kalonji Pro-Profile	Signing	Free	
June 20, 2025	MF	16	(United States) Corey Lundeen	(United States) Savannah Clovers	Signing	Free	
August 7, 2025	FW	22	(United States) Jesus Ibarra	(United States) Chattanooga FC	Signing	Free	
August 7, 2025	FW	15	(United States) Antonio Pineda	(United States) Hickory FC	Signing	Free	
September 11, 2025	MF	18	(Ivory Coast) Mohamed Diakite	(United States) Apotheos FC	Signing	Free	

=== Out ===
Date	Position	Number	Name	To	Type	Fee	Ref.
December 31, 2024	DF	52	(United States) Ozzie Cisneros	(United States) Sporting Kansas City	Loan Expired at the end of the year	NA	
December 31, 2024	MF	8	(Colombia) Jesus Orejuela		Contract Expired at the end of the year	NA	
December 31, 2024	FW	17	(Colombia) Carlos Mario Diaz		Contract Expired at the end of the year	NA	
December 31, 2024	MF	11	(Venezuela) Luis Lugo		Contract Expired at the end of the year	NA	
December 31, 2024	DF	5	(United States) Angel Aguas		Contract Expired at the end of the year	NA	
December 31, 2024	FW	9	(Senegal) Papa Ndoye		Contract Expired at the end of the year	NA	
December 31, 2024	FW	21	(Argentina) Federico Stachuk		Contract Expired at the end of the year	NA	
December 31, 2024	FW	23	(United States) Tyler Freeman	(United States) Ventura County Fusion	Contract Expired at the end of the year	NA	
February 28, 2025	DF	18	(United States) Jeremiah White IV	(Poland) Legia Warszawa	Transfer	Undisclosed	
March 7, 2025	FW	19	(United States) Nicholas Pechenyi	(Poland) JKS 1909 Jarosław	signing		
March 11, 2025	MF	68	(United States) Ozzie Ramos	(United States) Texoma FC	signing		
August 25, 2025	FW	7	(United States) Yekeson Subah	NA	Parted ways	NA	

=== Loan In ===
No.	Pos.	Player	Loaned from	Start	End	Source
17	MF	(Republic of Ireland) Glory Nzingo	(Wales) Swansea City	February 14, 2025	December 31, 2025	

=== Loan Out ===
No.	Pos.	Player	Loaned from	Start	End	Source

== Non-competitive fixtures ==
=== Preseason ===
February 18	Carolina Core FC	0–1	High Point Panthers	High Point, North Carolina
6:00 PM ET			68'	Stadium: Truist Point

February 22	Carolina Core FC	1–0	Wake Forest Demon Deacons	High Point, North Carolina
5:00 PM ET	Miller (yellow card) 9'; Canete 53'; Thomas (red card) 64'; Polanco (yellow card) 80'; Leonardi (yellow card) 90'; Cambindo (yellow card) 90+2'			Stadium: Truist Point

March 1	Carolina Core FC	1–2	UNC Greensboro Spartans	High Point, North Carolina
5:00 PM ET	Chica		13'; 90+4'	Stadium: Truist Point

=== Midseason ===
August 30	Carolina Core FC	2–1	Tigres UANL U23	High Point, North Carolina
7:30 PM ET	Thomas (yellow card) 19'; Sumo Jr. 58'; Lundeen 65'; Cuevas (yellow card) 79'		Azeves (yellow card) 35'; Isc. Galvan (yellow card) 44'; Isa. Galvan 54'; Noriega (yellow card) 62'; Jaime (yellow card) 63'	Stadium: Truist Point; Attendance: 3,611

== Competitive fixtures ==
=== MLS Next Pro Regular Season ===
March 13 1	Inter Miami CF II	1–1 (2–4 p)	Carolina Core FC	Fort Lauderdale, Florida
7:00 PM EDT	Sparks (yellow card) 49'; Pintér 53'	Report	Hadeed (yellow card) 14'; Polanco (yellow card) 18'; Evans 22'; Covi (yellow card) 72'	Stadium: Chase Stadium; Referee: Joshua Encarnación
	Penalties
	Cohen (penalty scored); Martinez (penalty missed); Montenegro (penalty scored); Flores (penalty missed)		(penalty scored) Sutton; (penalty scored) Evans; (penalty scored) Thomas; (penalty missed) Rodriguez; (penalty scored) Canete

March 24 2	NYCFC II	2–1	Carolina Core FC	New York City, New York
7:00 PM EDT	Ponce 18'; Molinari (yellow card) 47'; Elias (yellow card) 58'; Thomas 71' (o.g.); Infuso (yellow card) 90+3'	Report	Rodríguez (yellow card) 36'; Evans 80'; Hadeed (yellow card) 90+5'	Stadium: Icahn Stadium; Referee: Benjamin Meyer

April 5 3	Carolina Core FC	5–0	NYCFC II	High Point, North Carolina
7:00 PM EDT	Polanco 5'; Canete 9'; Evans 20' (pen.); Alenga (yellow card) 36'; Nzingo 78'; Cuevas 85'	Report	Lopez (yellow card) 19'	Stadium: Truist Point; Attendance: 4,430; Referee: Kaitlyn Trowbridge

April 13 4	Carolina Core FC	1–4	Chattanooga FC	High Point, North Carolina
3:00 PM EDT	Covi (yellow card) 10' (yellow-red card) 47'; Rodríguez (yellow card) 17'; Polanco 18' (yellow card) 72'; Leonardi (yellow card) 45+4'; Sutton (yellow card) 62'; Cambindo (yellow card) 84'	Report	Covi 13' (o.g.); Mendonça (yellow card) 25'; Sar-Sar 34'; Robertson 53'; Koehler (yellow card) 62'; Plougman 79'	Stadium: Truist Point; Attendance: 3,710; Referee: Josiah Parke

April 18 5	Toronto FC II	1–1 (1–4 p)	Carolina Core FC	North York, Toronto, Ontario
7:00 PM EDT	McDonald 32'	Report	Nzingo 31'; Canete (yellow card) 77'	Stadium: York Lions Stadium; Referee: Fabrizio Stasolla
	Penalties
	Ayari (penalty missed); Ythallo (penalty scored); Barrow (penalty missed)		(penalty scored) Evans; (penalty scored) Sutton; (penalty scored) Hadeed; (penalty scored) Rodriguez

April 23 6	Atlanta United 2	2–2 (5–4 p)	Carolina Core FC	Kennesaw, Georgia
7:30 PM EDT	Tablante 21' (yellow card) 61'; Dunham (yellow card) 23'; Wesseh 48'; Armas (yellow card) 87'	Report	Hadeed 29'; Miller (yellow card) 42'; Chica (yellow card) 47'; Rodriguez (yellow card) 50'; Leonardi 81'; Polanco (yellow card) 86'	Stadium: Fifth Third Bank Stadium; Referee: Jeremy Scheer
	Penalties
	Armas (penalty scored); Tablante (penalty scored); Mazzaferro (penalty scored); Torres (penalty missed); Moore (penalty scored); Weah (penalty scored)		(penalty scored) Evans; (penalty scored) Sutton; (penalty missed) Covi; (penalty scored) Polanco; (penalty scored) Canete; (penalty missed) Leonardi

April 26 7	Carolina Core FC	1–2	Crown Legacy FC	High Point, North Carolina
7:30 PM EDT	Polanco (yellow card) 66'; Canete 83'; Scarlett (yellow card) 90+2'	Report	Moore (yellow card) 9'; Boardman (yellow card) 41'; Sarkos 75'; Subotić 90+3' (yellow card) 90+4'	Stadium: Truist Point; Attendance: 4,070; Referee: Alejo Calume

May 4 8	New York Red Bulls II	2–2 (7–6 p)	Carolina Core FC	Montclair, New Jersey
5:00 PM EDT	Mehmeti (yellow card) 1'; Mosquera 17'; Nelich 74' (yellow card) 79'	Report	Canete (yellow card) 27' (goal) 50', 90+6'; Polanco (red card) 45+2'	Stadium: MSU Soccer Park; Referee: Danielle Chesky
	Penalties
	Kasule (penalty scored); Mosquera (penalty scored); Benedetti (penalty missed); Mehmeti (penalty missed); Nelich (penalty scored); Sullivan (penalty missed); Schwarz (penalty scored); Ramalho (penalty scored); Ruiz (penalty scored); Stokes (penalty scored)		(penalty scored) Sutton; (penalty missed) Scarlett; (penalty scored) Covi; (penalty missed) Leonardi; (penalty scored) Canete; (penalty missed) Juarez; (penalty scored) Sumo Jr.; (penalty scored) Alenga; (penalty scored) Nzingo; (penalty missed) Chica

May 10 9	Carolina Core FC	0–0 (2–3 p)	Huntsville City FC	High Point, North Carolina
7:00 PM EDT	Canete (yellow card) 45'; Rodríguez (yellow card) 64'; Covi (yellow card) 76'; Sumo Jr. (yellow card) 85'	Report	Koffi (yellow card) 37' (red card) 90+2'; O'Brien (yellow card) 63'	Stadium: Truist Point; Attendance: 4,205; Referee: Arman Becan
	Penalties
	Sutton (penalty missed); Rodríguez (penalty scored); Covi (penalty missed); Bazaes (penalty scored); Canete (penalty missed)		(penalty scored) Barrett; (penalty scored) Barker John; (penalty missed) O'Brien; (penalty scored) Sipic

June 1 10	Inter Miami CF II	1–2	Carolina Core FC	Fort Lauderdale, Florida
7:00 PM EDT	Sparks (yellow card) 43'; Thomas 65' (o.g.); Ferraina (yellow card) 90'	Report	Nzingo 4', 75'; Leonardi (yellow card) 28'; Miller (yellow card) 58'	Stadium: Chase Stadium; Referee: Elvis Osmanovic

June 11 11	Carolina Core FC	1–0	Orlando City B	High Point, North Carolina
7:30 PM EDT	Juarez 44'; Chica (yellow card) 80'; Leonardi (yellow card) 89'	Report		Stadium: Truist Point; Attendance: 3,811; Referee: Marie Durr

June 14 12	Carolina Core FC	1–1 (4–5 p)	Chicago Fire FC II	High Point, North Carolina
7:30 PM EDT	Canete 5' (yellow card) 63'; Miller (yellow card) 19'; Alenga (yellow card) 47'	Report	Reynolds (yellow card) 33'; Gasper 42'; Fleming III (yellow card) 81'	Stadium: Truist Point; Attendance: 3,838; Referee: Peter Bernardy
	Penalties
	Sutton (penalty scored); Hadeed (penalty scored); Bazaes (penalty scored); Covi (penalty scored); Canete (penalty missed)		(penalty scored) Borso; (penalty scored) Konincks; (penalty scored) Cassano; (penalty scored) Calle; (penalty scored) Fleming III

June 21 13	Carolina Core FC	1–2	New York Red Bulls II	High Point, North Carolina
7:30 PM EDT	Nzingo 39'; Thomas (yellow card) 56'	Report	Rosborough 16'; Jarvis (yellow card) 25'; Sserwadda (yellow card) 45'; Benedetti 50'; Jiménez (yellow card) 90+6'	Stadium: Truist Point; Attendance: 3,856; Referee: Izlen Peksenar

June 28 14	Columbus Crew 2	1–0	Carolina Core FC	Columbus, Ohio
6:00 PM EDT	Sy (yellow card) 30'; Presthus (yellow card) 37'; Rincon (yellow card) 64'; Palacios (yellow card) 68'; Adams 81'	Report		Stadium: Historic Crew Stadium; Referee: Atahan Yaya

July 4 15	Carolina Core FC	1–2	Inter Miami CF II	High Point, North Carolina
7:30 PM EDT	Cuevas 27'	Report	Saja 6'; Vorenkamp (yellow card) 21'; Pintér 84'	Stadium: Truist Point; Attendance: 4,430; Referee: Andrew Porada

July 10 16	Crown Legacy FC	0–0 (2–4 p)	Carolina Core FC	Matthews, North Carolina
7:00 PM EDT	Boardman (yellow card) 40'; Coulibaly (yellow card) 54'; Berchimas (yellow card) 70'	Report	Chica (yellow card) 29'; Canete (yellow card) 37'; Covi (yellow card) 40'; Bazaes (yellow card) 41'; Nzingo (yellow card) 72'	Stadium: Mecklenburg County Sportsplex; Referee: Johnathan Luk
	Penalties
	Subotić (penalty missed); Romero (penalty scored); Berchimas (penalty scored); Mendoza (penalty missed)		(penalty scored) Evans; (penalty scored) Sutton; (penalty scored) Canete; (penalty scored) Hadeed

July 13 17	Orlando City B	3–1	Carolina Core FC	Kissimmee, Florida
7:00 PM EDT	Ellis 22', 54' (pen.); Rodríguez (yellow card) 40'; Mercado (yellow card) 72'; Thalles 84' (yellow card) 85'; Loyola (yellow card) 90+2'	Report	Covi (yellow card) 45'; Rodriguez 75'; Canete (yellow card) 75'	Stadium: Osceola Heritage Park; Referee: Josue Meneses

July 19 18	Carolina Core FC	1–1 (5–4 p)	Atlanta United 2	High Point, North Carolina
9:33 PM EDT	Canete 4'; Sumo Jr. (red card) 35'; Evans (yellow card) 65'	Report	Weah (yellow card) 32'; Neri (yellow card) 71'; Armas 90'	Stadium: Truist Point; Attendance: 3,404; Referee: Gary Gutierrez
	Penalties
	Sutton (penalty missed); Bazaes (penalty scored); Thomas (penalty scored); P. Rodríguez (penalty scored); Covi (penalty scored); Rodriguez (penalty missed); Chica (penalty scored)		(penalty missed) Armas; (penalty scored) Mazzaferro; (penalty scored) Tablante; (penalty scored) Chong-Qui; (penalty scored) Neri; (penalty missed) Wynne; (penalty missed) Torres

July 30 19	Carolina Core FC	3–2	Philadelphia Union II	High Point, North Carolina
7:30 PM EDT	Nzingo 22' (pen.), 51' (pen.); Rodríguez 25' (yellow card) 49'; Alenga (yellow card) 33'; Chica (yellow card) 45+1'; Covi (yellow card) 78'	Report	Anderson 11'; Olivas 37' (pen.); Uzcátegui (yellow card) 71'; Sequera (yellow card) 90+2'; Pariano (yellow card) 90+6'	Stadium: Truist Point; Attendance: 2,992; Referee: Promise Adebayo-Ige

August 2 20	Carolina Core FC	1–0	New England Revolution II	High Point, North Carolina
7:30 PM EDT	Scarlett 74'	Report	Barry (yellow card) 85'; Souza (yellow card) 90+4'	Stadium: Truist Point; Attendance: 4,205; Referee: Russell Miller

August 10 21	Huntsville City FC	3–2	Carolina Core FC	Huntsville, Alabama
7:00 PM EDT	Knight 10'; Carleton 19', 26'; Mayaka (yellow card) 45+4'; Barker John (yellow card) 83'; Studenhofft (yellow card) 86'; Barrett (yellow card) 90+7'	Report	Ibarra 50'; Sumo Jr. 69'; Juarez (yellow card) 80'	Stadium: Wicks Family Field at Joe Davis Stadium; Referee: Kaitlyn Trowbridge

August 16 22	Carolina Core FC	0–1	Chattanooga FC	High Point, North Carolina
7:30 PM EDT	Covi (yellow card) 79' (yellow-red card) 87'	Report	Mendonca (yellow card) 45+1'; Ancelin (yellow card) 69'; Robertson 88' (pen.); Turner (yellow card) 90+7'	Stadium: Truist Point; Attendance: 4,477; Referee: Iryna Petrunok

August 24 23	FC Cincinnati 2	2–3	Carolina Core FC	Highland Heights, Kentucky
11:00 AM EDT	Jimenez 22' (yellow card) 52'; Felipe Dávila (yellow card) 80'; Opeyemi 85'	Report	Ibarra (yellow card) 11'; Kuisel 33' (o.g.); Evans 84'; Nzingo 90+1'; Juarez (yellow card) 90+4'	Stadium: NKU Soccer Stadium; Referee: Matthew Corrigan

September 4 24	Crown Legacy FC	3–4	Carolina Core FC	Matthews, North Carolina
7:00 PM EDT	Miller 9' (o.g.); Coulibaly (yellow card) 15'; Sing 50'; Neeley (yellow card) 54'; Smalls (yellow card) 56'; Thiago 90'; Mendoza (yellow card) 90+4'; Thomas (yellow card) 90+6'	Report	Canete 7'; Miller 41' (yellow card) 45+1'; Sumo Jr. 71'; Evans 74'; Covi (yellow card) 87'	Stadium: Mecklenburg County Sportsplex; Referee: Nicholas Strednak

September 13 25	Carolina Core FC	4–2	Atlanta United 2	High Point, North Carolina
7:30 PM EDT	Ibarra 37' (yellow card) 38'; Canete 45+1', 67' (pen.); Thomas (yellow card) 58' (goal) 62'; Cuevas (yellow card) 84'	Report	Weah 15' (yellow card) 43'; Pita 52'	Stadium: Truist Point; Attendance: 3,710; Referee: Muhammad Kaleia

September 21 26	Chattanooga FC	0–0 (5–6 p)	Carolina Core FC	Chattanooga, Tennessee
7:00 PM EDT	Koehler (yellow card) 35'; Garvianian (yellow card) 44'	Report	Chica (yellow card) 23'; Thomas (yellow card) 62'	Stadium: Finley Stadium; Attendance: 4,055; Referee: Mark Verso
	Penalties
	Robertson (penalty scored); Naglestad (penalty scored); Garvianian (penalty missed); Cohen (penalty scored); Sar-Sar (penalty scored); Mendonca (penalty scored); Brown (penalty missed)		(penalty scored) Evans; (penalty missed) Sutton; (penalty scored) JP Rodriguez; (penalty scored) Thomas; (penalty scored) Nzingo; (penalty scored) Sumo Jr.; (penalty scored) Scarlett

September 27 27	Carolina Core FC	3–3 (2–4 p)	Orlando City B	High Point, North Carolina
7:30 PM EDT	Thomas (yellow card) 13'; Leonardi 36', 40' (yellow card) 90+7'; Chica 52' (yellow card) 90+5'; JP Rodríguez (yellow card) 83'; Cantete (yellow card) 90+4'	Report	Guske (yellow card) 11'; Mohammed 45'; Hylton (yellow card) 45+1'; Caraballo 49'; Sutton 64' (o.g.); Mercado (yellow card) 83'	Stadium: Truist Point; Attendance: 4,774; Referee: Drew Klemp
	Penalties
	Evans (penalty missed); Lundeen (penalty scored); Thomas (penalty scored); Covi (penalty missed)		(penalty scored) Ellis; (penalty scored) Judelson; (penalty scored) Mohammed; (penalty scored) Guske

October 5 28	Huntsville City FC	3–0	Carolina Core FC	Huntsville, Alabama
1:00 PM EDT	Ekk 8', 22' (yellow card) 72'; Barker John (yellow card) 70'; Gill 77'; Coulibaly (red card) 90+6'	Report	Sutton (yellow card) 72'; Alenga (yellow card) 90+2'	Stadium: Wicks Family Field at Joe Davis Stadium; Referee: Calin Radosav

=== Playoffs ===
October 19 Conference Quarterfinals	New York Red Bulls II	5–1	Carolina Core FC	Montclair, New Jersey
7:00 PM EDT	Mosquera 3' (pen.), 80' (yellow card) 43'; Benedetti 34', 48'; Mitchell 47'; Worth (yellow card) 51'		Chica (yellow card) 2'; Thomas (yellow card) 30'; Pineda (yellow card) 44'; Leonardi (yellow card) 73'; Nzingo 83'	Stadium: MSU Soccer Park; Referee: Luis Diego Arroyo

=== Lamar Hunt US Open Cup ===
March 20 First Round	Carolina Core FC	4–2	Soda City FC	High Point, North Carolina
7:30 PM ET	Rodríguez 18' (pen.), 58'; Leonardi (yellow card) 29'; Covi (yellow card) 62'; Canete 69'; Evans 72'; Pannenberg (yellow card) 86'	Report	Martin (yellow card) 22'; Oseguera (yellow card) 66'; Thompson 79'; Salifu 82'	Stadium: Truist Point; Attendance: 2,511; Referee: Joe Surgan

April 1 Second Round	Charlotte Independence	2–1 (a.e.t.)	Carolina Core FC	Matthews, North Carolina
7:30 PM EDT	Álvarez 2'; DeShields (yellow card) 66'; Marou 93'; Chaney (yellow card) 120+2'		Rodriguez 10'; Cuevas (yellow card) 41'; Canete (yellow card) 98'; Juarez (yellow card) 105+4'; Bazaes (yellow card) 108'	Stadium: Sportsplex at Matthews; Referee: John Rush

== Statistics ==
=== Appearances and goals ===
No.	Pos	Nat	Player	Total		MLS Next Pro		U.S. Open Cup		MLSNP Playoffs	
No.	Pos	Nat	Player	Apps	Goals	Apps	Goals	Apps	Goals	Apps	Goals
0	GK	(United States) USA	Alex Sutton	29	0	28+0	0	0+0	0	1+0	0
1	GK	(United States) USA	Andrew Pannenberg	2	0	0+0	0	2+0	0	0+0	0
2	DF	(United States) USA	Daniel Chica	31	0	27+1	0	2+0	0	1+0	0
3	MF	(Jamaica) JAM	Zion Scarlett	16	1	3+11	1	1+1	0	0+0	0
4	DF	(United States) USA	Kai Thomas	22	1	18+2	1	1+0	0	1+0	0
6	DF	(Argentina) ARG	Juan Pablo Rodriguez	23	0	17+4	0	1+1	0	0+0	0
7	FW	(United States) USA	Yekeson Subah	1	0	0+1	0	0+0	0	0+0	0
8	FW	(Antigua and Barbuda) ANT	Drake Hadeed	11	1	5+6	1	0+0	0	0+0	0
9	FW	(Colombia) COL	David Polanco	14	2	8+5	2	0+1	0	0+0	0
10	MF	(England) ENG	Jacob Evans	28	6	21+5	5	2+0	1	0+0	0
11	FW	(Liberia) LBR	Anthony Sumo Jr.	19	2	4+14	2	0+0	0	0+1	0
12	MF	(Tanzania) TAN	Charles Alenga	31	0	25+3	0	2+0	0	1+0	0
13	FW	(Honduras) HON	Joshua Rodriguez	17	5	5+9	2	2+0	3	0+1	0
14	DF	(United States) USA	Jathan Juarez	31	1	25+3	1	2+0	0	1+0	0
15	FW	(United States) USA	Antonio Pineda	9	0	6+2	0	0+0	0	1+0	0
16	MF	(United States) USA	Corey Lundeen	8	0	0+7	0	0+0	0	1+0	0
17	MF	(Republic of Ireland) IRL	Glory Nzingo	27	9	15+10	8	0+1	0	0+1	1
18	MF	(Ivory Coast) CIV	Mohamed Diakite	0	0	0+0	0	0+0	0	0+0	0
19	MF	(Colombia) COL	Mateo Sarmiento	1	0	0+0	0	0+1	0	0+0	0
20	DF	(France) FRA	Ibrahim Covi	27	0	20+4	0	2+0	0	1+0	0
21	MF	(Dominican Republic) DOM	Derek Cuevas	22	2	6+13	2	1+1	0	0+1	0
22	FW	(United States) USA	Jesus Ibarra	8	2	5+2	2	0+0	0	1+0	0
24	MF	(Argentina) ARG	Facundo Canete	31	10	28+0	9	2+0	1	1+0	0
26	DF	(France) FRA	Paul Leonardi	26	3	21+3	3	1+0	0	1+0	0
29	MF	(Colombia) COL	Santiago Cambindo	7	0	2+3	0	1+1	0	0+0	0
31	GK	(United States) USA	Robert Bailey	0	0	0+0	0	0+0	0	0+0	0
44	DF	(United States) USA	Christian Diaz	0	0	0+0	0	0+0	0	0+0	0
77	MF	(Chile) CHI	Jonathan Bazaes	9	0	2+6	0	0+1	0	0+0	0
99	MF	(Liberia) LBR	Aryeh Miller	22	1	16+3	1	0+2	0	0+1	0

- Last updated: October 19, 2025
- Source: https://www.mlsnextpro.com/clubs/carolina-core-fc/stats/#season=MLS-SEA-0001K9&competition=mls-next-pro&club=MLS-CLU-00003I&statType=general&position=all

=== Top scorers ===
Rank	Position	Number	Name	MLS Next Pro	U.S. Open Cup	MLSNP Playoffs	Total
1	MF	24	(Argentina) Facundo Canete	9	1	0	10
2	MF	17	(Republic of Ireland) Glory Nzingo	8	0	1	9
3	MF	10	(England) Jacob Evans	5	1	0	6
4	FW	13	(Honduras) Joshua Rodriguez	2	3	0	5
5	MF	26	(France) Paul Leonardi	3	0	0	3
6	FW	9	(Colombia) David Polanco	2	0	0	2
6	FW	11	(Liberia) Anthony Sumo Jr.	2	0	0	2
6	MF	21	(Dominican Republic) Derek Cuevas	2	0	0	2
6	FW	22	(United States) Jesus Ibarra	2	0	0	2
10	DF	2	(United States) Daniel Chica	1	0	0	1
10	MF	3	(Jamaica) Zion Scarlett	1	0	0	1
10	DF	4	(United States) Kai Thomas	1	0	0	1
10	FW	8	(Antigua and Barbuda) Drake Hadeed	1	0	0	1
10	DF	14	(United States) Jathan Juarez	1	0	0	1
10	MF	99	(Liberia) Aryeh Miller	1	0	0	1
10			Own Goals	1	0	0	1
Total				42	5	1	48

- Last updated: October 19, 2025
- Source: https://www.mlsnextpro.com/clubs/carolina-core-fc/stats/#season=MLS-SEA-0001K9&competition=mls-next-pro&club=MLS-CLU-00003I&statType=general&position=all

=== Top assists ===
Rank	Position	Number	Name	MLS Next Pro	U.S. Open Cup	MLSNP Playoffs	Total
1	MF	24	(Argentina) Facundo Canete	5	1	0	6
2	MF	10	(England) Jacob Evans	4	0	0	4
3	DF	13	(United States) Jathan Juarez	3	0	0	3
3	DF	26	(France) Paul Leonardi	3	0	0	3
3	FW	11	(Liberia) Anthony Sumo Jr.	2	0	1	3
6	DF	2	(United States) Daniel Chica	2	0	0	2
6	FW	15	(United States) Antonio Pineda	2	0	0	2
6	MF	17	(Republic of Ireland) Glory Nzingo	2	0	0	2
6	DF	20	(France) Ibrahim Covi	2	0	0	2
6	MF	21	(Dominican Republic) Derek Cuevas	1	1	0	2
11	FW	22	(United States) Jesus Ibarra	1	0	0	1
11	MF	77	(Chile) Jonathan Bazaes	1	0	0	1
11	FW	13	(Honduras) Joshua Rodriguez	0	1	0	1
Total				28	3	1	32

- Last updated: October 19, 2025
- Source: https://www.mlsnextpro.com/clubs/carolina-core-fc/stats/#season=MLS-SEA-0001K9&competition=mls-next-pro&club=MLS-CLU-00003I&statType=general&position=all

=== Disciplinary record ===
No.	Pos.	Player	MLS Next Pro			U.S. Open Cup			MLSNP Playoffs			Total		
No.	Pos.	Player	Booked	(yellow card) (yellow-red card)	Sent off (straight red)	Booked	(yellow card) (yellow-red card)	Sent off (straight red)	Booked	(yellow card) (yellow-red card)	Sent off (straight red)	Booked	(yellow card) (yellow-red card)	Sent off (straight red)
0	GK	(United States) Alex Sutton	2	0	0	0	0	0	0	0	0	2	0	0
1	GK	(United States) Andrew Pannenberg	0	0	0	1	0	0	0	0	0	1	0	0
2	DF	(United States) Daniel Chica	6	0	0	0	0	0	1	0	0	7	0	0
3	MF	(Jamaica) Zion Scarlett	1	0	0	0	0	0	0	0	0	1	0	0
4	DF	(United States) Kai Thomas	4	0	0	0	0	0	1	0	0	5	0	0
6	DF	(Argentina) Juan Pablo Rodriguez	3	0	0	0	0	0	0	0	0	3	0	0
7	FW	(United States) Yekeson Subah	0	0	0	0	0	0	0	0	0	0	0	0
8	FW	(Antigua and Barbuda) Drake Hadeed	2	0	0	0	0	0	0	0	0	2	0	0
9	FW	(Colombia) David Polanco	4	0	1	0	0	0	0	0	0	4	0	1
10	MF	(England) Jacob Evans	1	0	0	0	0	0	0	0	0	1	0	0
11	FW	(Liberia) Anthony Sumo Jr.	1	0	1	0	0	0	0	0	0	1	0	1
12	MF	(Tanzania) Charles Alenga	4	0	0	0	0	0	0	0	0	4	0	0
13	FW	(Honduras) Joshua Rodriguez	3	0	0	0	0	0	0	0	0	3	0	0
14	DF	(United States) Jathan Juarez	2	0	0	1	0	0	0	0	0	3	0	0
15	FW	(United States) Antonio Pineda	0	0	0	0	0	0	1	0	0	1	0	0
17	MF	(Republic of Ireland) Glory Nzingo	1	0	0	0	0	0	0	0	0	1	0	0
18	MF	(Ivory Coast) Mohamed Diakite	0	0	0	0	0	0	0	0	0	0	0	0
19	MF	(Colombia) Mateo Sarimento	0	0	0	0	0	0	0	0	0	0	0	0
20	DF	(France) Ibrahim Covi	10	2	0	1	0	0	0	0	0	11	2	0
21	MF	(Dominican Republic) Derek Cuevas	1	0	0	1	0	0	0	0	0	2	0	0
22	FW	(United States) Jesus Ibarra	2	0	0	0	0	0	0	0	0	2	0	0
24	MF	(Argentina) Facundo Canete	7	0	0	1	0	0	0	0	0	8	0	0
26	DF	(France) Paul Leonardi	4	0	0	1	0	0	1	0	0	6	0	0
28	FW	(Argentina) Federico Stachuk	0	0	0	0	0	0	0	0	0	0	0	0
29	MF	(Colombia) Santiago Cambindo	1	0	0	0	0	0	0	0	0	1	0	0
31	GK	(United States) Robert Bailey	0	0	0	0	0	0	0	0	0	0	0	0
44	DF	(United States) Christian Diaz	0	0	0	0	0	0	0	0	0	0	0	0
77	MF	(Chile) Jonathan Bazaes	1	0	0	1	0	0	0	0	0	2	0	0
99	MF	(Liberia) Aryeh Miller	4	0	0	0	0	0	0	0	0	4	0	0
Total			64	2	2	7	0	0	4	0	0	75	2	2

- Last updated: October 19, 2025
- Source: https://www.mlsnextpro.com/clubs/carolina-core-fc/stats/#season=MLS-SEA-0001K9&competition=mls-next-pro&club=MLS-CLU-00003I&statType=general&position=all

== Awards and honors ==
=== MLS NEXT Pro Team of the Matchweek ===
Matchweek	Reference
4	
26	
27	

=== MLS NEXT Pro Player of the Matchweek ===
Player	Matchweek	Reference
(Republic of Ireland) Glory Nzingo	12	

=== MLS NEXT Pro Goal of the Matchweek ===
Player	Matchweek	Reference
(Republic of Ireland) Glory Nzingo	6	
(United States) Jathan Juarez	14	
(France) Paul Leonardi	29	
