= 2024 Carolina Core FC season =

Carolina Core FC
2024 season
- Owner: Megan Oglesby; Matt Penley; Mark Penley
- General manager: Eddie Pope
- Head coach: Roy Lassiter
- Stadium: Truist Point
- MLS Next Pro: Eastern Conference:10th; Overall:15th
- MLSNP Cup Playoffs: Did not Qualify
- 2024 U.S. Open Cup: Third Round
- Top goalscorer: League: Facundo Canete (11 goals); All: Facundo Canete (11 goals)
- Highest home attendance: 4,511 June 1
- Lowest home attendance: 2,522 August 28
- Average home league attendance: 3,738
- Biggest win: Carolina Core FC 4–1 Atlanta United 2 August 28
- Biggest defeat: Atlanta United 2 4–0 Carolina Core FC March 24, Carolina Core FC 1–5 Inter Miami CF II August 7
Home colors	Away colors

The 2024 Carolina Core FC Season is the club's first ever season in existence. This is the second independent club to play in a MLS Next Pro season alongside Chattanooga FC. The club is located in North Carolina, US.

== Players and staff ==
=== Current roster ===
As of August 27, 2024

No.	Pos.	Nation	Player
0	GK	USA	Alex Sutton
1	GK	USA	Andrew Pannenberg
2	DF	USA	Daniel Chica
4	DF	USA	Kai Thomas
5	DF	USA	Angel Aguas
6	DF	ARG	Juan Pablo Rodriguez
7	FW	USA	Yekeson Subah
8	MF	USA	Jesus Orejuela
9	FW	SEN	Papa Ndoye
10	DF	ENG	Jacob Evans
11	MF	VEN	Luis Lugo
12	MF	TAN	Alenga Charles
13	FW	HON	Josuha Rodriguez
14	DF	USA	Jathan Juarez
15	FW	COL	David Polanco
17	FW	COL	Carlos Mario Diaz
18	FW	USA	Jeremiah White IV
19	FW	USA	Nicholas Pechenyi
20	DF	FRA	Ibrahim Covi
21	MF	DOM	Derek Cuevas
22	DF	USA	Kiki Gregoire
23	FW	USA	Tyler Freeman
24	MF	ARG	Facundo Canete
25	FW	ATG	Drake Hadeed
28	FW	ARG	Federico Stachuk
29	MF	COL	Santiago Cambindo
31	GK	USA	Robert Bailey
52	MF	USA	Ozzie Cisneros (on loan from Sporting Kansas City)
77	MF	CHI	Jonathan Bazaes
99	MF	LBR	Aryeh Miller
68	MF	USA	Ozzie Ramos
—	DF	FRA	Paul Baptiste Behe Leonardi

=== Staff ===
- Eddie Pope – Chief Sporting Officer
- Roy Lassiter – Head Coach
- Amado Guevara – Assistant Coach
- Donovan Ricketts – Goalkeeping Coach
- Robert Ritchie – Director Of Soccer Operations

== Transfers ==
=== In ===
Date	Position	Number	Name	from	Type	Fee	Ref.
October 23, 2023	FW	25	(Antigua and Barbuda) Drake Hadeed	(United States) Columbus Crew Academy	Signing	NA	
October 23, 2023	MF	99	(Liberia) Aryeh Miller	(United States) Charlotte FC Academy	Signing	NA	
December 8, 2023	CB	20	(France) Ibrahim Covi	(Spain) Ponferradina B	Signing	NA	
December 11, 2023	GK	1	(United States) Andrew Pannenberg	(United States) Houston Dynamo Academy	Signing	NA	
December 13, 2023	FW	7	(United States) Yekeson Subah	(United States) Los Angeles FC 2	Signing	NA	
December 15, 2023	MF	11	(Venezuela) Luis Lugo	(United States) Florida Gulf Coast Eagles	Signing	NA	
December 20, 2023	DF	14	(United States) Jathan Juarez	(United States) Houston Dynamo 2	Signing	NA	
December 21, 2023	MF	8	(Colombia) Jesus Orejuela	(United States) Houston Dynamo 2	Signing	NA	
December 22, 2023	FW	28	(Argentina) Federico Stachuk	(Argentina) Club Atlético Banfield U20s	Signing	NA	
December 27, 2023	DF	5	(United States) Angel Aguas	(United States) FC Cincinnati 2	Signing	NA	
December 29, 2023	DF	4	(United States) Kai Thomas	(United States) FC Cincinnati 2	Signing	NA	
January 3, 2024	GK	0	(United States) Alex Sutton	(United States) Maryland Bobcats FC	Signing	NA	
January 8, 2024	FW	19	(United States) Nicholas Pechenyi	(United States) Twin City Toucans FC	Signing	Free	
January 10, 2024	GK	31	(United States) Robert Bailey	(United States) Lee Flames	Signing	Free	
January 12, 2024	MF	24	(Argentina) Facundo Canete	NA	Signing	Free	
January 17, 2024	MF	12	(Tanzania) Alenga Charles	(United States) FC Congo AZ	Signing	Free	
January 19, 2024	FW	15	(Colombia) David Polanco	(United States) Barry Buccaneers	Signing	NA	
January 22, 2024	DF	22	(United States) Kiki Gregoire	(United States) Barca Academy	Signing	NA	
January 30, 2024	FW	9	(Senegal) Papa Ndoye	(United States) Houston Dynamo 2	Signing	NA	
February 2, 2024	MF	10	(England) Jacob Evans	(United States) Houston Dynamo 2	Signing	NA	
February 6, 2024	FW	17	(Colombia) Carlos Mario Diaz	(United States) Houston Dynamo U20s	Signing	NA	
February 9, 2024	FW	13	(Honduras) Joshua Rodriguez	(United States) Butte United SC	Signing	NA	
February 14, 2024	FW	77	(Chile) Johnny Bazaes	(United States) Albion SD	Signing	NA	
February 15, 2024	FW	23	(United States) Tyler Freeman	(United States) Huntsville City FC	Signing	NA	
March 8, 2024	DF	6	(Argentina) Juan Pablo Rodriguez	(Argentina) Club Atletico Lanus	Signing	NA	
March 11, 2024	MF	21	(Spain) Derek Cuevas	(Spain) FC Barcelona U20s	Signing	Free	
March 15, 2024	MF	18	(United States) Jeremiah White IV	(United States) Philadelphia Union Academy	Signing	NA	
March 28, 2024	DF	44	(United States) Christian Diaz	(United States) LA FC Academy	Signing	NA	
April 26, 2024	MF	20	(Colombia) Santiago Cambindo	(United States) Houston Dynamo U20s	Signing	NA	
August 5, 2024	MF	68	(United States) Ozzie Ramos	(United States) Forward Madison FC	Signing	NA	
August 6, 2024	DF	2	(United States) Daniel Chica	(United States) Lexington SC	Signing	NA	
August 27, 2024	DF		(France) Paul Baptiste Behe Leonardi	(France) Stade Laval B	Signing	NA	

=== Out ===
Date	Position	No.	Name	To	Type	Fee	Ref.
July 1, 2024	DF	44	(United States) Christian Diaz	(United States) LA FC Academy	Free Transfer	Free	

=== Loan In ===
No.	Pos.	Player	Loaned from	Start	End	Source
20	MF	(United States) Ozzie Cisneros	(United States) Sporting Kansas City	April 16, 2024	December 31, 2024	

=== Loan Out ===
No.	Pos.	Player	Loaned to	Start	End	Source
28	FW	(Argentina) Federico Stachuk	(United States) Greenville Triumph SC	August 30, 2024	December 31, 2024	
23	FW	(United States) Tyler Freeman	(United States) Hartford Athletic	September 11, 2024	December 31, 2024	

== Non-competitive fixtures ==
=== Preseason ===
February 3	Piedmont Triad FC U18/U19s	v	Carolina Core FC
6:00 PM ET			Subah	Attendance: Match was behind closed doors.

February 10	UNC Wilmington	0–1	Carolina Core FC	Wilmington, North Carolina
6:00 PM ET			Lugo 40'	Stadium: UNCW Soccer Stadium

February 17	North Carolina FC	5–2	Carolina Core FC	Cary, North Carolina
1:00 PM ET	Anderson 9'; McLaughlin 14'; Perez 19'; Blanco 60'; Da Costa 68'	Report	Hadeed (yellow card) 10' (goal) 28'; Ndoye 65'	Stadium: WakeMed Soccer Park

February 19	High Point Panthers	0–3	Carolina Core FC	High Point, North Carolina
6:00 PM ET			Ndoye 14', 84'; Orejuela (yellow card) 37'; Gregoire (yellow card) 39'; Subah 79'	Stadium: Vert Stadium; Attendance: 1,365

February 24	Elon	1–1	Carolina Core FC	Elon, North Carolina
6:00 PM ET	35'		Canete (yellow card) 28'; Subah 41'; Juarez (yellow card) 49'; Orejuela (yellow card) 84'	Stadium: Rhodes Stadium

March 2	Charlotte Independence	2–1	Carolina Core FC	Charlotte, North Carolina
2:00 PM ET	82'; 84'		Evans (yellow card) 19'; Ndoye 52' (pen.)	Stadium: American Legion Memorial Stadium

March 7	South Carolina United Heat	v	Carolina Core FC	Columbia, South Carolina
3:00 PM ET				Attendance: Match was behind closed doors

=== Friendlies ===
October 12th	Carolina Core FC	1–0	CD Cruz Azul U23	High Point, North Carolina
7:30 PM ET	Polanco 22'; Cuevas (yellow card) 40'; Covi (yellow card) 44'; Ramos (yellow card) 79'; Gregoire (yellow card) 80'; Bazaes (red card) 87'	Report	(yellow card) 42'; (yellow card) 42'; (yellow card) 74'; (red card) 87'; Bench (yellow card) 90+6'	Stadium: Truist Point; Attendance: 3,278; Referee: Nicholas Strednak

== Competitive fixtures ==
=== Standings ===
Pos	Div	Team	Pld	W	SOW	SOL	L	GF	GA	GD	Pts	Qualification
8	SE	Crown Legacy FC	28	11	5	2	10	51	46	+5	45	Qualification for the Playoffs
9	SE	Chattanooga FC	28	9	8	2	9	45	42	+3	45	
10	SE	Carolina Core FC	28	12	3	1	12	39	45	−6	43	
11	NE	New York Red Bulls II	28	10	4	2	12	56	61	−5	40	
12	NE	Toronto FC II	28	10	1	5	12	44	51	−7	37	

Source: MLSNP Eastern Conference
Rules for classification: 1) points; 2) total wins; 3) total goal differential; 4) total goals scored; 5) fewer disciplinary points; 6) away goal differential; 7) away goals scored; 8) home goals differential; 9) home goals scored; 10) coin toss (2 clubs tied) or drawing of lots (≥3 clubs tied)

=== Overall table ===
Pos	Team	Pld	W	SOW	SOL	L	GF	GA	GD	Pts	Awards
1	North Texas SC	28	16	6	2	4	56	32	+24	62	Regular season champion
2	St. Louis City 2	28	17	1	3	7	53	35	+18	56	
3	FC Cincinnati 2	28	16	2	2	8	47	34	+13	54	
4	Philadelphia Union II	28	15	3	1	9	59	41	+18	52	
5	The Town FC	28	13	4	4	7	41	28	+13	51	
6	Inter Miami CF II	28	14	0	6	8	53	45	+8	48	
7	Chicago Fire FC II	28	11	5	4	8	51	51	0	47	
8	Tacoma Defiance	28	13	2	3	10	59	53	+6	46	
9	Orlando City B	28	11	4	5	8	53	42	+11	46	
10	Los Angeles FC 2	28	12	3	3	10	51	54	−3	45	
11	New York City FC II	28	11	3	6	8	58	46	+12	45	
12	Columbus Crew 2	28	11	4	4	9	53	47	+6	45	
13	Crown Legacy FC	28	11	5	2	10	51	46	+5	45	
14	Chattanooga FC	28	9	8	2	9	45	42	+3	45	
15	Carolina Core FC	28	12	3	1	12	39	45	−6	43	
16	Ventura County FC	28	8	8	3	9	49	49	0	43	
17	Whitecaps FC 2	28	10	3	4	11	45	44	+1	40	
18	New York Red Bulls II	28	10	4	2	12	56	61	−5	40	
19	Houston Dynamo 2	28	10	2	5	11	46	45	+1	39	
20	Real Monarchs	28	9	5	2	12	39	41	−2	39	
21	Sporting Kansas City II	28	10	2	4	12	53	57	−4	38	
22	Portland Timbers 2	28	8	4	6	10	43	45	−2	38	
23	Toronto FC II	28	10	1	5	12	44	51	−7	37	
24	Austin FC II	28	7	4	7	10	44	49	−5	36	
25	Minnesota United FC 2	28	8	4	0	16	43	73	−30	32	
26	Atlanta United 2	28	7	4	3	14	42	64	−22	32	
27	Huntsville City FC	28	8	0	5	15	39	53	−14	29	
28	Colorado Rapids 2	28	6	1	3	18	37	54	−17	23	
29	New England Revolution II	28	4	4	2	18	37	59	−22	22	

Source: MLSNP
Rules for classification: 1) points; 2) total wins; 3) total goal differential; 4) total goals scored; 5) fewer disciplinary points; 6) away goal differential; 7) away goals scored; 8) home goals differential; 9) home goals scored; 10) coin toss (2 clubs tied) or drawing of lots (≥3 clubs tied)

=== MLS Next Pro Regular Season ===
March 17 1	Crown Legacy FC	1–1 (2–3 SO)	Carolina Core FC	Matthews, North Carolina
5:00 PM ET	Scardina 21'; Forbes (yellow card) 36'; Mirkovic (yellow card) 64'	Report	Rodriguez (yellow card) 35'; Covi (yellow card) 48'; Orejuela (yellow card) 53'; Polanco 90+1' (yellow card) 90+2'	Stadium: Sportsplex at Matthews; Attendance: 1,372; Referee: Alyssa Nichols
	Shootout
	Rodrigues (penalty scored); Romero (penalty missed); Mayaka (penalty missed); Neeley (penalty scored); Pedro (penalty missed)		(penalty missed) Polanco; (penalty scored) Rodriguez; (penalty scored) Canete; (penalty missed) Hadeed; (penalty scored) Covi

March 24 2	Atlanta United 2	4–0	Carolina Core FC	Kennesaw, Georgia
3:00 PM ET	Armas (yellow card) 2' (goal) 34'; Brennan 24', 26'; Ayo (yellow card) 40'; Tmimi 79'	Report	Diaz (yellow card) 51'; Canete (yellow card) 59'	Stadium: Fifth Third Stadium; Attendance: 550; Referee: Elvis Osmanovic

March 31 3	New England Revolution II	2–1	Carolina Core FC	Foxborough, Massachusetts
3:00 PM ET	Fry 3'; Quiñones (yellow card) 20'; Barry (yellow card) 56'; Panayotou 59'; Weinstein (yellow card) 90+8'	Report 1 Report 2	Orejuela (yellow card) 25'; Polanco 37'; White (yellow card) 40'; Canete (yellow card) 87'	Stadium: Gillette Stadium; Attendance: (Change); Referee: John Matto

April 22 4	Chicago Fire FC II	2–1	Carolina Core FC	Bridgeview, Illinois
7:00 PM ET	Casas 14'; Osorio 45+4' (pen.); Koffi (yellow card) 61'; Calle (yellow card) 74'; Los (yellow card) 89'; Blake (yellow card) 90+2'	Report 1	Canete (yellow card) 19'; Polanco (yellow card) 31'; Juarez (yellow card) 37'; Evans 76'	Stadium: SeatGeek Stadium; Referee: Calin Radosav

April 27 5	Chattanooga FC	2–0	Carolina Core FC	Chattanooga, Tennessee
7:00 PM ET	Ibarra 7' (yellow card) 58'; Arthur (yellow card) 55'; Watson (yellow card) 60'; Garvanian (yellow card) 68' (goal) 75'	Report 1	Cuevas (yellow card) 57'	Stadium: Finley Stadium; Attendance: 3,614; Referee: Atahan Yaya

May 8 6	Atlanta United 2	1–2	Carolina Core FC	Kennesaw, Georgia
7:30 PM ET	Carleton (yellow card) 12'; Armas (yellow card) 26'; Okello 31'; Moore (yellow card) 45+1'; Cooke (yellow card) 90+1' (yellow-red card) 90+1'	Report	Polanco (yellow card) 13'; Evans 43'; Diaz 45+2'; Ndoye (red card) 86'; Sutton (yellow card) 89'	Stadium: Fifth Third Bank Stadium; Attendance: 346; Referee: Alejo Calume

May 19 7	Inter Miami CF II	1–1 (2–4 SO)	Carolina Core FC	Fort Lauderdale, Florida
3:00 PM ET	Boatwright 79'	Report	Evans 15'; Canete (yellow card) 22'; Thomas (red card) 26'; White IV (yellow card) 85'	Stadium: DRV PNK Stadium; Referee: Adam Kilpatrick
	Shootout
	Fray (penalty scored); Reyes (penalty scored); Carmichael (penalty missed); Morales (penalty missed)		(penalty scored) Sutton; (penalty scored) Aguas; (penalty scored) Canete; (penalty scored) Diaz

May 23 8	Toronto FC II	2–1	Carolina Core FC	North York, Toronto, Ontario
7:00 PM ET	Staniland 14' (yellow card) 65'; Altobelli (yellow card) 32'; Pudztahegyi (yellow card) 75'; Pearlman (yellow card) 79'; Batiz 90+1'	Report	Canete (yellow card) 8' (goal) 84' (pen.); Diaz (yellow card) 20'; Covi (yellow card) 37'	Stadium: York Lions Stadium; Referee: Youcef Boumsied

June 1 9	Carolina Core FC	1–4	Huntsville City FC	High Point, North Carolina
8:00 PM ET	Cuevas (yellow card) 45'; Aguas 50'; Covi (yellow card) 75'		Johnston (yellow card) 31'; Ajago 56'; Pasnik 64'; Sipic 90+1'	Stadium: Truist Point; Attendance: 4,511; Referee: Rebecca Pagan

June 7 10	Orlando City B	2–2 (6–5 SO)	Carolina Core FC	Kissimmee, Florida
7:00 PM ET	Otero (yellow card) 6'; Guske (yellow card) 29'; Freeman 72' (pen.); Almaguer 86'; Cocca (yellow card) 90+1'	Report	Canete 7' (pen.); Ndoye 16'; Cuevas (yellow card) 39'	Stadium: Osceola Heritage Park; Referee: Elvis Osmanovic
	Shootout
	Solís (penalty scored); Cocca (penalty scored); Freeman (penalty missed); Almaguer (penalty missed); Mohammed (penalty scored); Taifi (penalty scored); Abdullah (penalty scored); Kibunguchy (penalty scored)		(penalty scored) Sutton; (penalty missed) Polanco; (penalty missed) Canete; (penalty scored) Diaz; (penalty scored) Covi; (penalty scored) Freeman; (penalty scored) Bazaes; (penalty missed) Cambindo
Note: Match was originally going to be played on April 14, but was changed.

June 15 11	Carolina Core FC	1–3	FC Cincinnati 2	High Point, North Carolina
7:30 PM ET	Rodríguez 19'; Canete (yellow card) 20'; Diaz (yellow card) 67'; Stachuk (yellow card) 84'; Thomas (yellow card) 90+3'	Report	Schaefer 22'; Castellano 54'; Daley 56'; Benalcazar (yellow card) 85'	Stadium: Truist Point; Attendance: 4,022; Referee: John Matto

June 22 12	Chattanooga FC	1–2	Carolina Core FC	Chattanooga, Tennessee
7:00 PM ET	Prepeliță (yellow card) (yellow-red card) 33'; Kwak (yellow card) 35'; McGrath (yellow card) 39'; Arthur (yellow card) 45+2'; James 76'; Viáfara (yellow card) 79'; Gray (yellow card) 82'	Report	Canete 4' (yellow card) 71'; Rodriguez 29' (yellow card) 57'; Covi (yellow card) 33'; Díaz (yellow card) 82'; Sutton (yellow card) 90+7'	Stadium: Finley Stadium; Attendance: 3,867; Referee: Olvin Olvia

June 28 13	Huntsville City FC	1–1 (5–6 SO)	Carolina Core FC	Huntsville, Alabama
8:00 PM ET	Perkins (yellow card) 45'; Jones (yellow card) 63'; Knight 78'; Wright (yellow card) 83'; Velazquez-Lopez (yellow card) 90+6'	Report	Covi (yellow card) 60'; Rodríguez 85'; Juarez (yellow card) 90+2'	Stadium: Joe Davis Stadium; Attendance: 4,211; Referee: Emmy Nonso-Anyakwo
	Shootout
	Ritondale (penalty missed); Perkins (penalty missed); Wright (penalty scored); Knight (penalty scored); O'Brien (penalty scored); Jones (penalty scored); Sangwa (penalty scored); Velazquez-Lopez (penalty missed)		(penalty scored) Sutton; (penalty scored) Diaz; (penalty missed) Subah; (penalty missed) Ndoye; (penalty scored) Canete; (penalty scored) Thomas; (penalty scored) Rodríguez; (penalty scored) Juarez

July 7 14	Orlando City B	1–2	Carolina Core FC	Kissimmee, Florida
7:00 PM ET	Mohammed 45+3'; Freeman (yellow card) 55'; Banguero (yellow card) 86'; Taifi (yellow card) 90+4'	Report	Aguas (yellow card) 27'; Thomas (yellow card) 42'; Covi 60' (pen.); Rodríguez 67'; Charles (yellow card) 90+2'; Cambindo (yellow card) 90+4'	Stadium: Osceola Heritage Park; Referee: Elton Garcia

July 13 15	Carolina Core FC	2–1	Crown Legacy FC	High Point, North Carolina
7:00 PM ET	Thomas (yellow card) 33'; Juarez 45+5'; Miller (yellow card) 49'; Rodríguez (yellow card) 71' (goal) 76'	Report	Duke (yellow card) 27'; Cambridge (yellow card) 45+1'; Sing 51'; Nyandjo (yellow card) 85'	Stadium: Truist Point; Attendance: 4,083; Referee: Kyle Johnston

July 17 16	Carolina Core FC	2–1	Chattanooga FC	High Point, North Carolina
6:30 PM ET	Cambindo (yellow card) 15'; Covi 38' (pen.); Evans 65'	Report	Kwak (yellow card) 33'; Watson (yellow card) 55'; Jiménez (yellow card) 62'; McGrath 88'	Stadium: Truist Point; Attendance: 3,152; Referee: Marie Durr

July 27 17	Carolina Core FC	0–1	NYCFC II	High Point, North Carolina
7:30 PM ET	Díaz (yellow card) 37' (yellow-red card) 45+3'; Rodríguez (yellow card) 51'; Bazaes (yellow card) 87'	Report	Baiera (yellow card) 63'; Ruiz 81'	Stadium: Truist Point; Attendance: 4,133; Referee: Izlen Peksenar

August 3 18	Carolina Core FC	1–2	Orlando City B	High Point, North Carolina
7:30 PM ET	Canete (yellow card) 45+4'; Cuevas (yellow card) 54' (yellow-red card) 82'; Polanco 78'; Rodríguez (yellow card) 79'	Report	Platts 22'; Mercado (yellow card) 32'; Reid-Brown (yellow card) 33'; Mohammed 45'; Loyola (red card) 45+4'; Almaguer (yellow card) 81'; Solís (yellow card) 82'	Stadium: Truist Point; Attendance: 3,856; Referee: Stearne Briem

August 7 19	Carolina Core FC	1–5	Inter Miami CF II	High Point, North Carolina
7:00 PM ET	Rodríguez (red card) 55'; Polanco (yellow card) 83'; Sessock 90+1' (o.g.)	Report	Flores 8'; Sunderland 18' (yellow card) 49'; Casas (yellow card) 45+1'; Thomas 48' (o.g.); Zeltzer-Zubida 53'; Ferraina (yellow card) 68'; Carmichael 70'; Ledesma (yellow card) 86'	Stadium: Truist Point; Attendance: 2,720; Referee: Joe Surgan

August 16 20	FC Cincinnati 2	0–1	Carolina Core FC	Highland Heights, Kentucky
6:00 PM ET	Castellano (yellow card) 29'; Gibert (yellow card) 78'	Report	Gregoire (yellow card) 31'; Chica (yellow card) 84'; Evans 90+2'	Stadium: NKU Soccer Stadium; Referee: JC Griggs

August 24 21	Carolina Core FC	2–1	New England Revolution II	High Point, North Carolina
7:30 PM ET	Canete 85', 90+1'	Report	Mussenden (yellow card) 8' (yellow-red card) 21'; Monis 16'; Klein (yellow card) 37'	Stadium: Truist Point; Attendance: 4,011; Referee: Emma Richards

August 28 22	Carolina Core FC	4–1	Atlanta United 2	High Point, North Carolina
7:30 PM ET	Canete 2', 57' (yellow card) 6'; Mario Díaz (yellow card) 24'; Charles (yellow card) 41'; Polanco 45'; Ramos (yellow card) 79'; Evans 90'	Report	Morales (yellow card) 28' (yellow-red card) 45+3'; Dudley 38'; Hibbert (yellow card) 45+4'; Tmimi (yellow card) 82'	Stadium: Truist Point; Attendance: 2,522; Referee: Danielle Chesky

September 1 23	Carolina Core FC	4–2	New York Red Bulls II	High Point, North Carolina
7:30 PM ET	Chica (yellow card) 25'; Sutton (yellow card) 40'; Juarez (yellow card) 45+2'; Evans 47'; Polanco 58' (yellow card) 58'; Canete 82' (pen.), 90+11'; Cambindo (yellow card) 90'	Report	Hall 9'; Ofori 28'; Mosquera (yellow card) 40'; Collahuazo (yellow card) 45'; Berkley (yellow card) 48'; Sserwadda (yellow card) 63'; O'Connor (yellow card) 89'	Stadium: Truist Point; Referee: Jalen Gray

September 11 24	Carolina Core FC	0–2	Philadelphia Union II	High Point, North Carolina
6:30 PM ET	Cambindo (yellow card) 22'; Evans (yellow card) 72'	Report	Pariano 3' (pen.); Makhanya (yellow card) 15'; LeBlanc (yellow card) 61'; Mastrodimos (yellow card) 74'; Olney 77'	Stadium: Truist Point; Attendance: 3,333; Referee: Alexandra Billeter

September 14 25	Carolina Core FC	2–1	Crown Legacy FC	High Point, North Carolina
8:00 PM ET	Chica (yellow card) 6'; Evans 14'; Canete 65' (pen.); Polanco (yellow card) 90+4'; Sutton (yellow card) 90+6'	Report	Gorno (yellow card) 17' (goal) 56'; Neeley (yellow card) 67'; Tuiloma (yellow card) 71'; Duke (yellow card) 89'	Stadium: Truist Point; Attendance: 4,038; Referee: Benjamin Meyer

September 22 26	Columbus Crew 2	0–2	Carolina Core FC	Columbus, Ohio
3:00 PM ET	Adams (yellow card) 20'; Alaouieh (yellow card) 23'; Rogers (yellow card) 28' (yellow-red card) 88'; Rayo (red card) 45+5'; Keita (yellow card) 52'; González (yellow card) 87'	Report	Canete 26' (pen.); Polanco 43'; Covi (yellow card) 45+7'	Stadium: Historic Crew Stadium; Referee: Robert Vincze

September 29 27	Carolina Core FC	2–0	Huntsville City FC	High Point, North Carolina
5:00 PM ET	Juan Pablo Rodriguez 14'; Thomas (yellow card) 28'; Covi 56' (pen.)	Report	Jones (yellow card) 54'; O'Brien (yellow card) 55'; Wright (yellow card) 64'; Jonathan Bolanos (yellow card) 74'	Stadium: Truist Point; Attendance: 4,106; Referee: Josiah Parke

October 6 28	Carolina Core FC	0–1	Inter Miami CF II	High Point, North Carolina
1:00 PM ET	Canete (yellow card) 19'; Thomas (yellow card) 33'; Covi (yellow card) 90+3'; Sutton (yellow card) 90+5'	Report	Morales (yellow card) 21'; Martinez (yellow card) 45+1'; Abadia-Reda (yellow card) 51'; Cohen 79'; Zeltzer-Zubida (yellow card) 81'	Stadium: Truist Point; Attendance: 4,111; Referee: Shawn Tehini

=== Lamar Hunt US Open Cup ===
March 21 First Round	Carolina Core FC	3–2	NoVa FC	Greensboro, North Carolina
7:30 PM ET	Hadeed 18'; Cuevas (yellow card) 43'; Canete (yellow card) 48'; Polanco 50' (yellow card) 80'; Rodríguez 82' (yellow card) 83'	Report 1	Medina (yellow card) 16'; Holmes 34'; Akinkoye (yellow card) 37'; Abril 40'; Kofi (yellow card) 79'	Stadium: UNCG Soccer Stadium; Attendance: 1,511; Referee: MJ Tehini

April 3 Second Round	Vermont Green FC	1–2	Carolina Core FC	Burlington, Vermont
7:00 PM ET	Bazini 28' (pen.); Prego (yellow card) 51'; Vaza (yellow card) 64'; Labovitz (red card) 90'	Report	Ndoye 60' (pen.); Subah (yellow card) 62'; Rodríguez 70' (yellow card) 90+1'; Thomas (yellow card) 83'; Polanco (yellow card) 87'; Covi (yellow card) 90'	Stadium: Virtue Field; Attendance: 2,500; Referee: Brendan Fanning

April 17 Third Round	North Carolina FC	1–0	Carolina Core FC	Cary, North Carolina
7:00 PM ET	Servania (yellow card) 27'; Placias 60' (yellow card) 90+8'; Lumsden (yellow card) 78'; Hayes (yellow card) 87'	Report	Ndoye (yellow card) 41'; Covi (yellow card) 71'; Orejuela (yellow card) 78'; Bench (yellow card) 84'; Rodríguez (yellow card) 88'; Guevara (yellow card) 90+1'; Canete (yellow card) 90+6'	Stadium: WakeMed Soccer Park; Attendance: 1,112; Referee: Josh Parke

== Statistics ==
=== Appearances and goals ===
No.	Pos	Nat	Player	Total		MLS Next Pro		U.S. Open Cup		MLSNP Playoffs	
No.	Pos	Nat	Player	Apps	Goals	Apps	Goals	Apps	Goals	Apps	Goals
0	GK	(United States) USA	Alex Sutton	28	0	26+0	0	2+0	0	0+0	0
1	GK	(United States) USA	Andrew Pannenberg	3	0	2+0	0	1+0	0	0+0	0
2	DF	(United States) USA	Daniel Chica	9	0	6+3	0	0+0	0	0+0	0
4	DF	(United States) USA	Kai Thomas	30	0	26+1	0	3+0	0	0+0	0
5	DF	(United States) USA	Angel Aguas	9	1	5+2	1	0+2	0	0+0	0
6	DF	(Argentina) ARG	Juan Pablo Rodriguez	8	1	5+2	1	1+0	0	0+0	0
7	FW	(United States) USA	Yekeson Subah	14	0	4+8	0	1+1	0	0+0	0
8	MF	(United States) USA	Jesus Orejuela	15	0	5+7	0	1+2	0	0+0	0
9	FW	(Senegal) SEN	Papa Ndoye	12	2	4+6	1	2+0	1	0+0	0
10	MF	(England) ENG	Jacob Evans	31	8	28+0	8	2+1	0	0+0	0
11	MF	(Venezuela) VEN	Luis Lugo	13	0	2+10	0	1+0	0	0+0	0
12	MF	(Tanzania) TAN	Alenga Charles	18	0	17+1	0	0+0	0	0+0	0
13	FW	(Honduras) HON	Joshua Rodriguez	28	7	13+12	5	1+2	2	0+0	0
14	DF	(United States) USA	Jathan Juarez	29	1	23+4	1	1+1	0	0+0	0
15	FW	(Colombia) COL	David Polanco	26	7	15+8	6	3+0	1	0+0	0
17	FW	(Colombia) COL	Carlos Mario Diaz	23	0	15+8	0	0+0	0	0+0	0
18	FW	(United States) USA	Jeremiah White IV	8	0	4+1	0	1+2	0	0+0	0
19	FW	(United States) USA	Nicholas Pechenyi	0	0	0+0	0	0+0	0	0+0	0
20	DF	(France) FRA	Ibrahim Covi	28	3	25+0	3	2+1	0	0+0	0
21	MF	(Spain) ESP	Derek Cuevas	22	0	10+10	0	1+1	0	0+0	0
22	DF	(United States) USA	Kiki Gregoire	14	0	8+4	0	1+1	0	0+0	0
23	FW	(United States) USA	Tyler Freeman	4	0	0+3	0	1+0	0	0+0	0
24	MF	(Argentina) ARG	Facundo Canete	28	11	25+0	11	3+0	0	0+0	0
25	FW	(Antigua and Barbuda) ATG	Drake Hadeed	6	1	0+5	0	1+0	1	0+0	0
26	DF	(France) FRA	Paul Leonardi	4	0	0+4	0	0+0	0	0+0	0
28	FW	(Argentina) ARG	Federico Stachuk	2	0	1+1	0	0+0	0	0+0	0
29	MF	(Colombia) COL	Santiago Cambindo	22	0	19+3	0	0+0	0	0+0	0
31	GK	(United States) USA	Robert Bailey	0	0	0+0	0	0+0	0	0+0	0
44	DF	(United States) USA	Christian Diaz	14	1	10+1	1	3+0	0	0+0	0
52	MF	(United States) USA	Ozzie Cisneros	4	0	3+1	0	0+0	0	0+0	0
68	MF	(United States) USA	Ozzie Ramos	7	0	0+7	0	0+0	0	0+0	0
77	MF	(Chile) CHI	Jonathan Bazaes	8	0	1+6	0	1+0	0	0+0	0
99	MF	(Liberia) LBR	Aryeh Miller	9	0	6+3	0	0+0	0	0+0	0

- Last updated: October 6, 2024
- Source: https://www.mlsnextpro.com/clubs/carolina-core-fc/stats/#season=2024&competition=mls-next-pro&club=21148&statType=general&position=all

=== Top scorers ===
Rank	Position	Number	Name	MLS Next Pro	U.S. Open Cup	MLSNP Playoffs	Total
1	MF	24	(Argentina) Facundo Canete	11	0	0	11
2	MF	10	(England) Jacob Evans	8	0	0	8
3	FW	15	(Colombia) David Polanco	6	1	0	7
3	FW	13	(Honduras) Joshua Rodriguez	5	2	0	7
5	DF	20	(France) Ibrahim Covi	2	0	0	2
5	FW	9	(Senegal) Papa Ndoye	1	1	0	2
7	DF	5	(United States) Angel Aguas	1	0	0	1
7	DF	6	(Argentina) Juan Pablo Rodriguez	1	0	0	1
7	DF	15	(United States) Jathan Juarez	1	0	0	1
7	DF	44	(United States) Christian Alejandro Diaz	1	0	0	1
7	FW	25	(Antigua and Barbuda) Drake Hadeed	0	1	0	1
7			Own goal	1	0	0	1
Total				38	5	0	43

- Last updated: September 29, 2024
- Source: https://www.mlsnextpro.com/clubs/carolina-core-fc/stats/#season=2024&competition=mls-next-pro&club=21148&statType=general&position=all

=== Top assists ===
Rank	Position	Number	Name	MLS Next Pro	U.S. Open Cup	MLSNP Playoffs	Total
1	MF	24	(Argentina) Facundo Canete	7	0	0	7
2	MF	10	(England) Jacob Evans	6	0	0	6
3	MF	21	(Spain) Derek Cuevas	5	0	0	5
4	FW	4	(United States) Kai Thomas	2	0	0	2
4	FW	17	(Colombia) Carlos Mario Diaz	2	0	0	2
6	FW	14	(United States) Jathan Juarez	1	0	0	1
6	DF	44	(Colombia) Christian Alejandro Diaz	1	0	0	1
6	FW	15	(Colombia) David Polanco	0	1	0	1
Total				24	1	0	25

- Last updated: September 14, 2024
- Source: https://www.mlsnextpro.com/clubs/carolina-core-fc/stats/#season=2024&competition=mls-next-pro&club=21148&statType=general&position=all

=== Disciplinary record ===
No.	Pos.	Player	MLS Next Pro			U.S. Open Cup			MLSNP Playoffs			Total		
No.	Pos.	Player	Booked	(yellow card) (yellow-red card)	Sent off (straight red)	Booked	(yellow card) (yellow-red card)	Sent off (straight red)	Booked	(yellow card) (yellow-red card)	Sent off (straight red)	Booked	(yellow card) (yellow-red card)	Sent off (straight red)
0	GK	(United States) Alex Sutton	4	0	0	0	0	0	0	0	0	4	0	0
1	GK	(United States) Andrew Pannenberg	1	0	0	0	0	0	0	0	0	1	0	0
2	DF	(United States) Daniel Chica	3	0	0	0	0	0	0	0	0	3	0	0
4	DF	(United States) Kai Thomas	5	0	1	1	0	0	0	0	0	6	0	1
5	DF	(United States) Angel Aguas	1	0	0	0	0	0	0	0	0	1	0	0
6	DF	(Argentina) Juan Pablo Rodriguez	1	0	0	0	0	0	0	0	0	1	0	0
7	FW	(United States) Yekeson Subah	0	0	0	1	0	0	0	0	0	1	0	0
8	MF	(United States) Jesus Orejuela	2	0	0	1	0	0	0	0	0	3	0	0
9	FW	(Senegal) Papa Ndoye	0	0	1	1	0	0	0	0	0	1	0	1
10	MF	(England) Jacob Evans	1	0	0	0	0	0	0	0	0	1	0	0
11	MF	(Venezuela) Luis Lugo	0	0	0	0	0	0	0	0	0	0	0	0
12	MF	(Tanzania) Alenga Charles	2	0	0	0	0	0	0	0	0	2	0	0
13	FW	(Honduras) Joshua Rodriguez	4	0	1	3	0	0	0	0	0	7	0	1
14	DF	(United States) Jathan Juarez	3	0	0	0	0	0	0	0	0	3	0	0
15	FW	(Colombia) David Polanco	6	0	0	2	0	0	0	0	0	8	0	0
17	FW	(Colombia) Carlos Mario Diaz	2	0	0	0	0	0	0	0	0	2	0	0
18	FW	(United States) Jeremiah White IV	4	1	0	0	0	0	0	0	0	4	1	0
19	FW	(United States) Nicholas Pechenyi	0	0	0	0	0	0	0	0	0	0	0	0
20	DF	(France) Ibrahim Covi	7	0	0	2	0	0	0	0	0	9	0	0
21	MF	(Spain) Derek Cuevas	5	1	0	1	0	0	0	0	0	6	1	0
22	DF	(United States) Kiki Gregoire	1	0	0	0	0	0	0	0	0	1	0	0
23	FW	(United States) Tyler Freeman	0	0	0	0	0	0	0	0	0	0	0	0
24	MF	(Argentina) Facundo Canete	10	0	0	1	0	0	0	0	0	11	0	0
25	FW	(Antigua and Barbuda) Drake Hadeed	0	0	0	0	0	0	0	0	0	0	0	0
28	FW	(Argentina) Federico Stachuk	1	0	0	0	0	0	0	0	0	1	0	0
29	MF	(Colombia) Santiago Cambindo	5	0	0	0	0	0	0	0	0	5	0	0
31	GK	(United States) Robert Bailey	0	0	0	0	0	0	0	0	0	0	0	0
44	DF	(United States) Christian Diaz	3	0	0	0	0	0	0	0	0	3	0	0
52	MF	(United States) Ozzie Cisneros	0	0	0	0	0	0	0	0	0	0	0	0
68	MF	(United States) Ozzie Ramos	1	0	0	0	0	0	0	0	0	1	0	0
77	MF	(Chile) Jonathan Bazaes	1	0	0	0	0	0	0	0	0	1	0	0
99	MF	(Liberia) Aryeh Miller	1	0	0	0	0	0	0	0	0	1	0	0
Total			73	3	2	16	0	0	0	0	0	89	3	2

- Last updated: October 6, 2024
- Source: https://www.mlsnextpro.com/clubs/carolina-core-fc/stats/#season=2024&competition=mls-next-pro&club=21148&statType=general&position=all

== Awards and honors ==
=== MLS NEXT Pro Team of the Matchweek ===
Matchweek	Reference
23	
25	

=== MLS NEXT Pro Team of the Month ===
Month	Reference
August	

=== MLS NEXT Pro Goal of the Matchweek ===
Player	Matchweek	Reference
(United States) Jathan Juarez	18	

=== MLS NEXT Player of the Matchweek ===
Player	Matchweek	Reference
(Argentina) Facundo Canete	25	

=== MLS NEXT Player of the Month ===
Player	Month	Reference
(Argentina) Facundo Canete	August	

=== MLS NEXT Coach of the Month ===
Coach	Month	Reference
(United States) Roy Lassiter	August	

=== MLS NEXT Goalkeeper of the Month ===
Player	Month	Reference
(United States) Alex Sutton	August	
