= Glory Nzingo =

Irish footballer

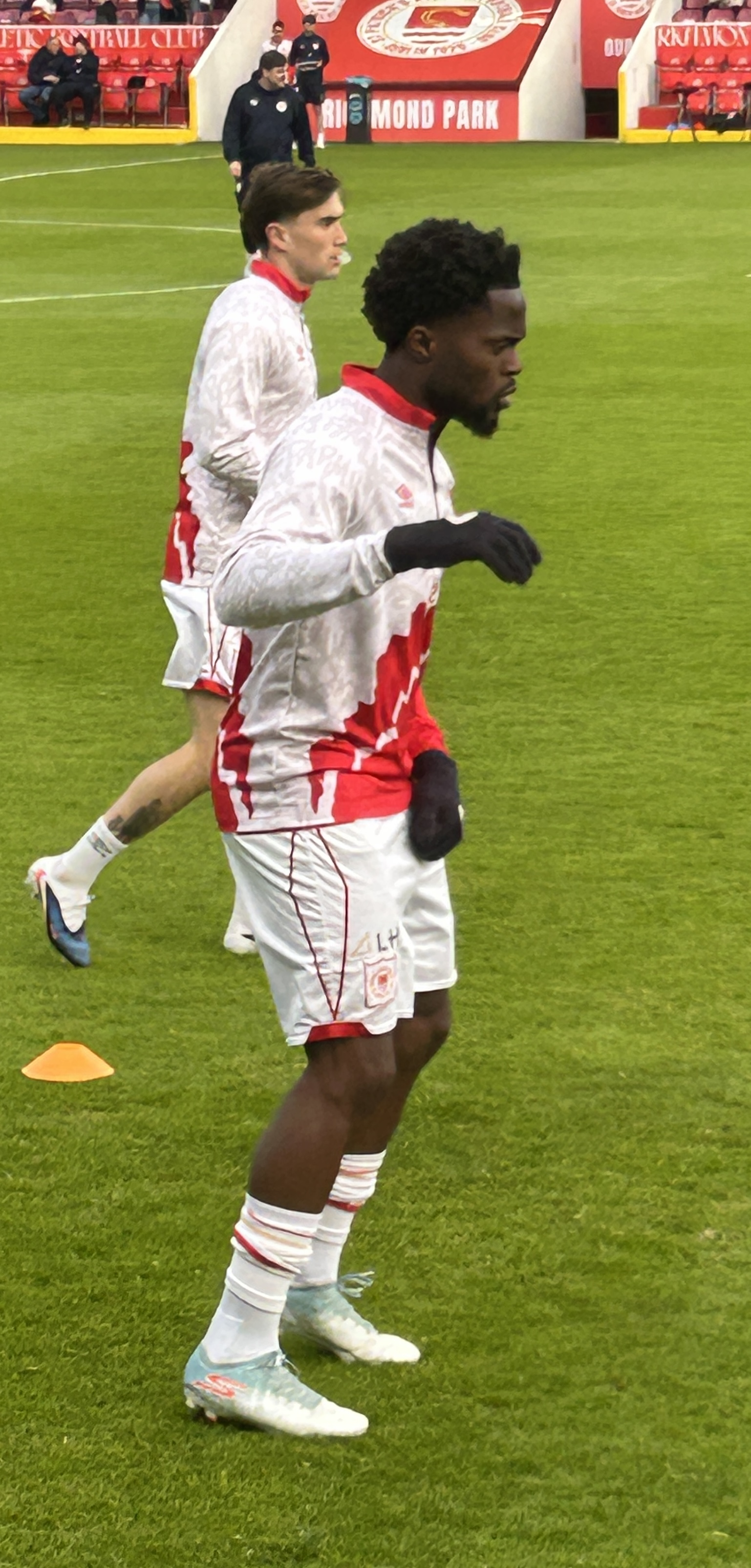
- Nzingo during a pre-match warmup with St Patrick's Athletic in 2026.

Personal information
- Date of birth: 4 November 2004 (age 22)
- Place of birth: Dublin, Republic of Ireland
- Positions: Attacking midfielder; forward

Youth career
- Mountview Boys
- Castleknock Celtic
- –2016: Home Farm
- 2016–2019: Cherry Orchard
- 2019–2021: St Patrick's Athletic
- 2021–2023: Stade de Reims
- 2023–2025: Swansea City

Senior career*
Years	Team	Apps	(Gls)
2022–2023	Stade de Reims B	10	(0)
2023–2026	Swansea City	0	(0)
2025	→ Carolina Core (loan)	25	(8)
2026	St Patrick's Athletic	7	(0)

International career^{‡}
2019	Republic of Ireland U15	5	(0)
2020	Republic of Ireland U16	4	(1)
2022	Republic of Ireland U19	3	(0)
2024	Republic of Ireland U21	2	(0)
- * Club domestic league appearances and goals as of 16:04, 27 July 2026 (UTC) ‡ National team caps and goals as of 17:28, 6 October 2026 (UTC)

Glory Nzingo (born 4 November 2004) is an Irish professional footballer who plays as a midfielder.

== Club career ==
=== Early career ===
A native of Blanchardstown, County Dublin, Nzingo played for the youth sides of Mountview Boys, Castleknock Celtic, Home Farm and Cherry Orchard. He moved to St Patrick's Athletic in January 2019. He made his senior debut for St Pat's in a 4–0 pre-season friendly loss to English side Chelsea, at the age of fourteen in July 2019. In 2020, he was named Football Association of Ireland under-15 player of the year.

=== Stade de Reims ===
In June 2021, French side Stade Rennais launched a bid for Nzingo. However, he went on to join fellow French side Stade de Reims in July of the same year. He played 10 games for the club's B side in the France's fourth tier, the Championnat National 2.

=== Swansea City ===
On 22 June 2023, it was announced that Nzingo had signed for the academy of Swansea City for an undisclosed fee. He made three appearances in the Welsh League Cup during his time with the club.

==== Carolina Core loan ====
On 14 February 2025, Nzingo joined MLS Next Pro side Carolina Core on loan until 31 December 2025. He made his debut on 2 April 2025, in a 2–1 loss to Charlotte Independence in the U.S. Open Cup. He made a total of 27 appearances in all competitions during his loan spell, scoring 9 goals. Having returned to Swansea after his loan spell, he went on trial with his former club St Patrick's Athletic in January 2026, scoring in a 4–1 win over Wexford in a pre-season friendly on 12 January.

=== St Patrick's Athletic ===
On 29 January 2026, Nzingo signed for League of Ireland Premier Division club St Patrick's Athletic after a successful trial period, having previously spent time in the club's academy between 2019 and 2021. On 8 February 2026, he made his debut for the club in the opening game of the season, a 0–0 draw with Bohemians at the Aviva Stadium. On 28 March 2026, he scored twice in a 5–3 win over Montpelier in the Leinster Senior Cup. On 27 July 2026, Nzingo departed the club by mutual consent, having made just 10 appearances in all competitions, with all 7 of his league appearances coming from the bench.

== International career ==
Nzingo has represented the Republic of Ireland at youth international level. In 2020 Nzingo was named U15 International Player of the Year at the annual FAI International Awards. In November 2024, he received his first call up to the Republic of Ireland U21 squad for their two friendlies against Sweden U21 in Marbella, Spain. He made his debut in a 2–0 defeat to Sweden on 14 November 2024.

== Career statistics ==
As of matches played 29 May 2026

Appearances and goals by club, season and competition
Club	Season	League			National cup		League cup		Other		Total	
Club	Season	Division	Apps	Goals	Apps	Goals	Apps	Goals	Apps	Goals	Apps	Goals
Stade de Reims B	2021–22	Championnat National 2	6	0	—		—		0	0	6	0
Stade de Reims B	2022–23	Championnat National 2	4	0	—		—		0	0	4	0
Stade de Reims B	Total		10	0	—		—		0	0	10	0
Swansea City	2023–24	EFL Championship	0	0	0	0	0	0	2 (Note: Appearance(s) in the Welsh League Cup)	0	2	0
Swansea City	2024–25	EFL Championship	0	0	0	0	0	0	1	0	1	0
Swansea City	2025–26	EFL Championship	0	0	0	0	—		—		0	0
Swansea City	Total		0	0	0	0	0	0	3	0	3	0
Carolina Core (loan)	2025	MLS Next Pro	25	8	1	0	—		1 (Note: Appearance in the 2025 MLS Next Pro Playoffs)	1	27	9
St Patrick's Athletic	2026	LOI Premier Division	7	0	0	0	–		3 (Note: Appearance(s) in the Leinster Senior Cup)	2	10	2
Career total			42	8	1	0	0	0	7	3	50	11
