= Caio Ramalho =

Brazilian footballer

Personal information
- Full name: Caio Ramalho Leite
- Date of birth: 21 January 2007 (age 19)
- Place of birth: Brazil
- Height: 1.85 m (6 ft 1 in)
- Position: Defender

Youth career
- 2023–2026: Sfera FC
- 2024: → Torino FC (loan)

Senior career*
Years	Team	Apps	(Gls)
2025	→ New York Red Bulls II (loan)	2	(0)
- * Club domestic league appearances and goals as of 18:48, 18 August 2025 (UTC)

Caio Ramalho Leite (born 21 January 2007) is a Brazilian professional footballer who plays as a defender.

== Career ==
=== Early career ===
Caio Ramalho began his youth career with Sfera Futebol Clube, playing for the under-17 and under-20 sides. His play with Sfera caught the attention of Italian Serie A side Torino FC, which he joined on loan and featured for Torino's U-18s in the 2024 Torneo di Viareggio, where the team advanced to the quarterfinals of the competition. Leite logged two starts for a total of 170 minutes played, including a start in their 3–0 win over Lucchese Primavera U-19s in the quarterfinals.

Upon returning to Brazil, he played with Sfera's U-20s in the 2024 Copa São Paulo de Futebol Junior, where he made five appearances, logging a total of 423 minutes played. He made his debut with the club on 4 January 2024, in a 1–0 win over Botafogo SP U-20.

==== New York Red Bulls II ====
On 28 January 2025, Caio Ramalho was signed on loan by New York Red Bulls II to compete in MLS Next Pro.

== Career statistics ==
As of match played 10 May 2025

Appearances and goals by club, season and competition
Club	Season	League			National cup		Continental		Other		Total	
Club	Season	Division	Apps	Goals	Apps	Goals	Apps	Goals	Apps	Goals	Apps	Goals
New York Red Bulls II (loan)	2025	MLS Next Pro	2	0	0	0	—		0	0	2	0
Career total			2	0	0	0	0	0	0	0	2	0
