= Isaías Galván =

Mexican footballer (born 2005)

Isaias Galván
Personal information
- Full name: Isaías Betsán Galván Peña
- Date of birth: 14 March 2005 (age 21)
- Place of birth: Monterrey, Mexico
- Height: 1.71 m (5 ft 7 in)
- Position: Forward

Team information
- Current team: Tigres UANL
- Number: 264

Youth career
- Tigres UANL

Senior career*
Years	Team	Apps	(Gls)
2023–	Tigres UANL	1	(0)
- * Club domestic league appearances and goals as of 16:53, 15 June 2023 (UTC)

Isaías Betsán Galván Peña (born 14 March 2005) is a Mexican professional footballer who currently plays as a forward for Tigres UANL.

== Club career ==
Seen as one of the best prospects in the Tigres UANL academy, Galván was promoted to the under-20 side at the age of seventeen, and was tipped to become a first team player after impressive performances. Having made his debut in the 2022–23 season, he was invited by German side Bayern Munich to be part of their "World Squad" initiative, representing the club in international friendlies.

== Personal life ==
Galván is the twin brother of fellow professional footballer Isac Galván, who also plays for Tigres UANL.

== Career statistics ==
=== Club ===
As of 15 June 2023.

Appearances and goals by club, season and competition
Club	Season	League			Cup		Continental		Other		Total	
Club	Season	Division	Apps	Goals	Apps	Goals	Apps	Goals	Apps	Goals	Apps	Goals
Tigres UANL	2022–23	Liga MX	1	0	0	0	0	0	0	0	1	0
Tigres UANL	2023–24	Liga MX	0	0	0	0	0	0	0	0	0	0
Career total			1	0	0	0	0	0	0	0	1	0
