= Tyler Freeman (soccer) =

American soccer player (born 2003)

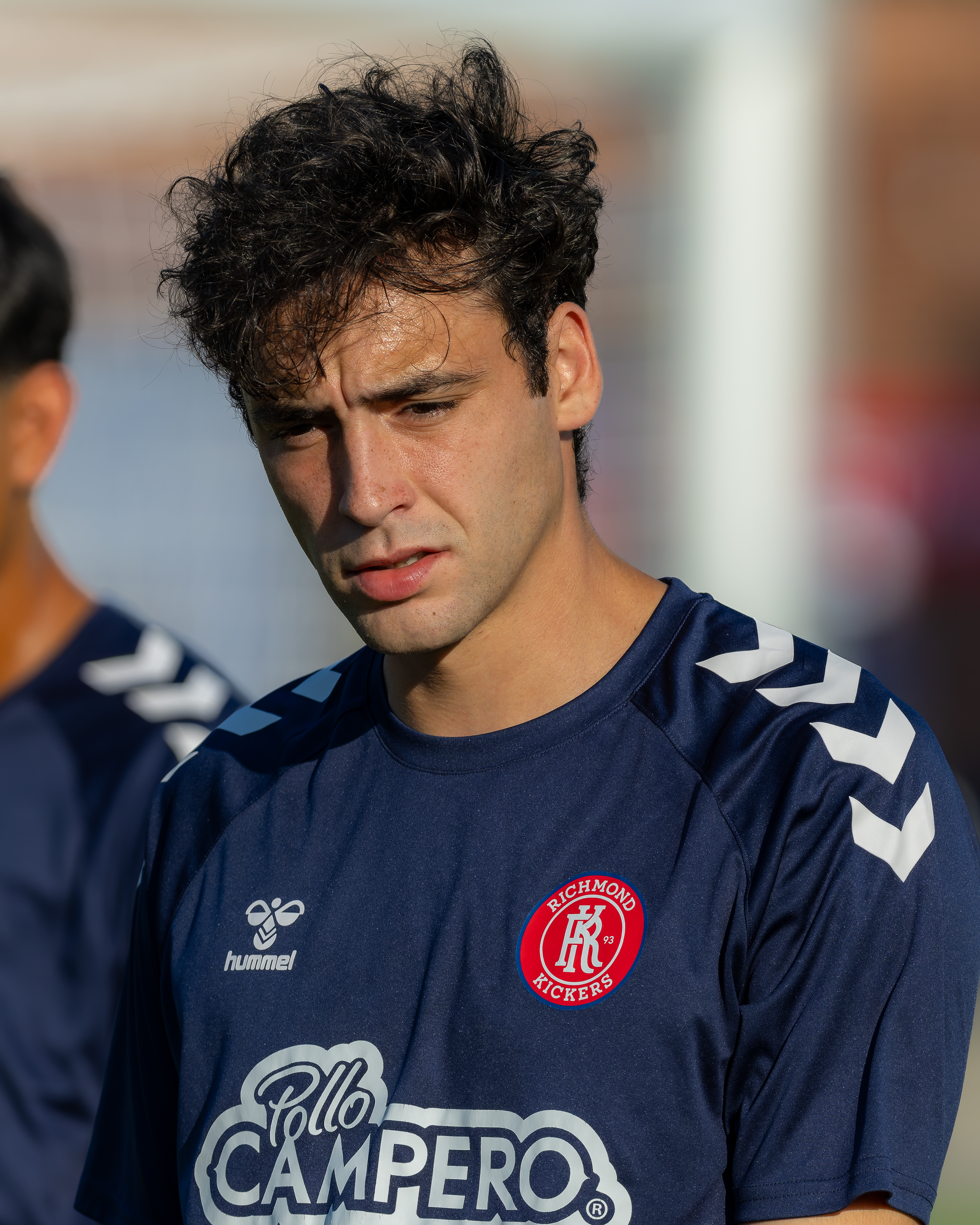
- Freeman with the Richmond Kickers in 2026

Personal information
- Full name: Tyler Freeman
- Date of birth: January 9, 2003 (age 23)
- Place of birth: Overland Park, Kansas, United States
- Height: 5 ft 10 in (1.78 m)
- Positions: Forward; winger

Team information
- Current team: Richmond Kickers
- Number: 23

Youth career
- 2014–2020: Sporting Kansas City
- 2021–2022: → Karlsruher SC (loan)

Senior career*
Years	Team	Apps	(Gls)
2019–2022	Sporting Kansas City	0	(0)
2019–2021	Sporting Kansas City II	35	(6)
2022	Loudoun United	24	(8)
2023	Nashville SC	0	(0)
2023	Huntsville City	10	(0)
2023	→ Birmingham Legion (loan)	5	(0)
2024	Carolina Core	3	(0)
2024	→ Hartford Athletic (loan)	4	(0)
2025	Ventura County Fusion	0	(0)
2025	Western Suburbs	9	(2)
2026–	Richmond Kickers	24	(2)

International career^{‡}
2019	United States U17	7	(1)
- * Club domestic league appearances and goals as of November 2, 2026 ‡ National team caps and goals as of November 16, 2019

Tyler Freeman (born January 9, 2003) is an American professional soccer player who plays as a forward for the Richmond Kickers in USL League One.

== Club career ==
Born in Overland Park, Kansas, Freeman joined the Sporting Kansas City youth academy in 2014. During his time with the academy, Freeman progressed through the club ranks, playing with the under-12s through to the under-19s.

On October 8, 2018, after scoring 17 goals for the under-17s, Freeman signed a professional homegrown player deal with Sporting Kansas City ahead of the 2019 season. He made his debut for the club's reserve side, Sporting Kansas City II, in the USL Championship on March 9, 2019, against New York Red Bulls II. Freeman started and played 67 minutes during the 3–1 defeat. He then scored his first professional goal on July 17 against Hartford Athletic, his goal being the fourth in a 4–3 victory. Throughout his first professional season, Freeman made a total of 17 appearances for Sporting Kansas City II, scoring the 1 goal. He also made appearance on the bench for the first-team during their 1–1 draw against FC Cincinnati on April 7.

In 2020, Freeman continued to play with Sporting Kansas City II, scoring two goals in nine matches during a COVID-19 affected season. He scored his first goal of the season on September 9 against Indy Eleven, a consolation 88th minute free kick goal during a 2–1 defeat.

On August 3, 2021, Freeman moved on loan to the under-19s of German 2. Bundesliga side Karlsruher SC until June 2022.

Sporting Kansas City recalled Freeman from his loan on January 14, 2022, ahead of the 2022 Major League Soccer season. He was waived one month later by the club.

On March 11, 2022, Freeman was signed by Loudoun United FC, the reserve team of D.C. United. On March 19, Freeman scored two goals in his second match for the club, a 3–0 win over New York Red Bulls II, earning him a player of the match honor.

On 3 January 2023, Freeman joined Major League Soccer side Nashville SC on a free transfer, signing a four-year contract with the club in the process. On July 29, 2023, Freeman joined USL Championship side Birmingham Legion on loan for the remainder of the season. He was released by Nashville following their 2023 season.

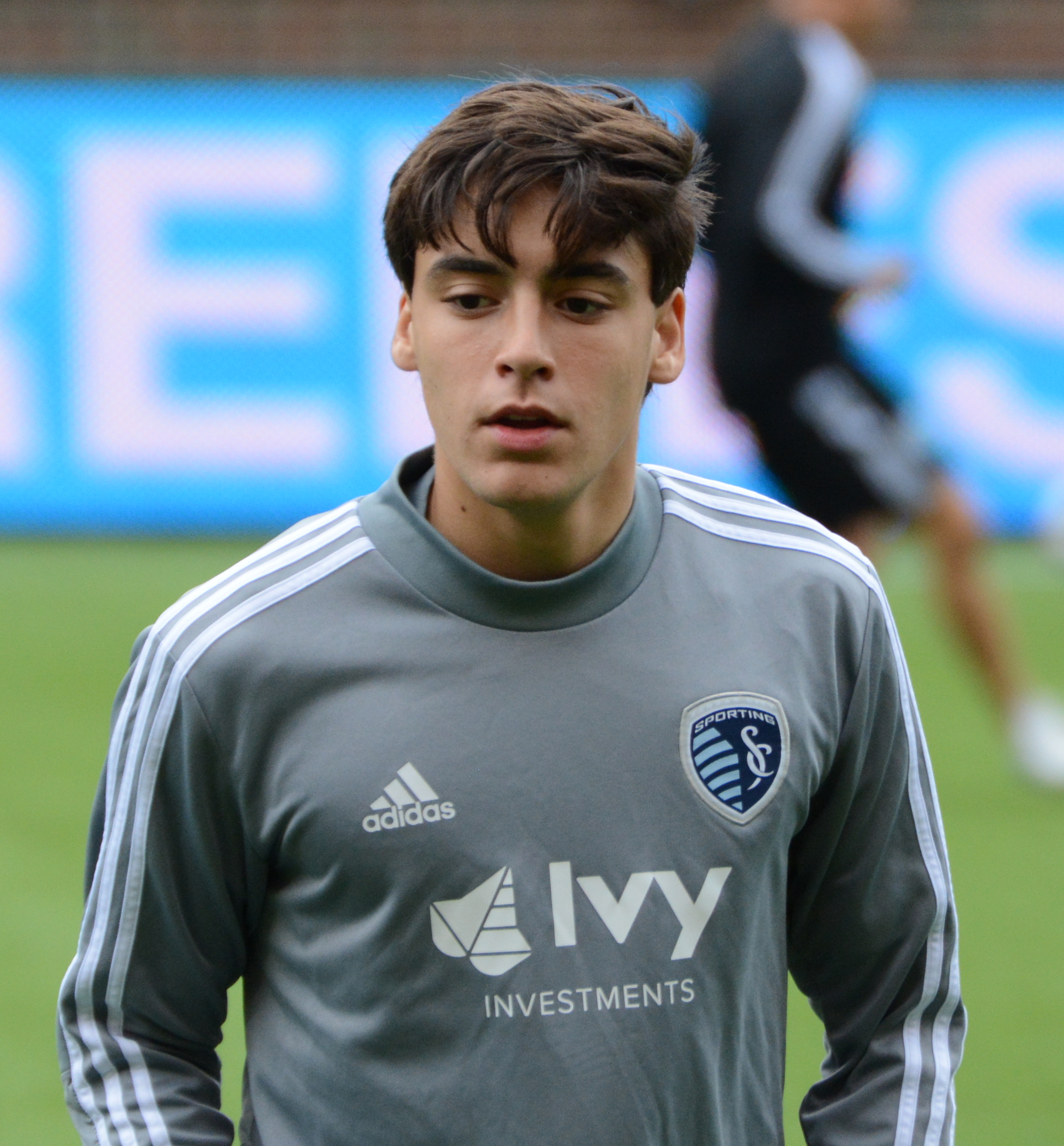
Freeman with Sporting Kansas City in 2019

Freeman signed with MLS Next Pro club Carolina Core FC ahead of their 2024 season. He appeared in three league matches and one U.S. Open Cup. He was loaned to Hartford Athletic in the USL Championship in September 2024. He played in four matches for Hartford.

Freeman played with USL League Two side Ventura County Fusion in their 2025 U.S. Open Cup campaign, playing 30 minutes in their first round loss to AV Alta FC.

In May 2025, Freeman signed with Western Suburbs FC in the New Zealand Central League.

On 14 January 2026, Freeman went back to the United States and signed for the Richmond Kickers in USL League One. He made his debut for the club in a 1–1 draw against AV Alta.

== International career ==
Freeman made his international debut for the United States under-17s on August 7, 2018, against Costa Rica U17, scoring a goal during the 2–2 draw.

== Career statistics ==
As of match played June 20, 2022

Appearances and goals by club, season and competition
Club	Season	League			National cup		Continental		Total	
Club	Season	Division	Apps	Goals	Apps	Goals	Apps	Goals	Apps	Goals
Sporting Kansas City II	2019	USL Championship	17	1	—		—		17	1
Sporting Kansas City II	2020	USL Championship	9	2	—		—		9	2
Sporting Kansas City II	2021	USL Championship	9	3	—		—		9	3
Sporting Kansas City II	Total		35	6	—		—		35	6
Loudoun United	2022	USL Championship	18	6	—		—		18	6
Career total			53	12	—		—		53	12
