= Drake Hadeed =

Antiguan footballer

Personal information
- Date of birth: 21 November 2007 (age 18)
- Place of birth: Miami, Florida, United States
- Position: Forward

Team information
- Current team: Antequera CF

Youth career
- –2020: North Coast FC
- 2020–2023: West Ham United
- 2023: Columbus Crew

Senior career*
Years	Team	Apps	(Gls)
2024–2025	Carolina Core	16	(1)
2026–	Antequera CF	0	(0)

International career^{‡}
2022–	Antigua and Barbuda U20	2	(0)
2025–	Antigua and Barbuda	2	(0)
- * Club domestic league appearances and goals as of 15:48, 14 January 2026 (UTC) ‡ National team caps and goals as of 15:48, 14 January 2026 (UTC)

Drake Hadeed (born 21 November 2007) is an Antiguan footballer who plays for the Antequera CF in Spain's Primera Federación. Born in the United States, he represents Antigua and Barbuda at international level.

== Club career ==
Hadeed began his career with youth club North Coast FC in his native Antigua and Barbuda. In 2019, he enrolled in a school in England. For several years prior, he had split his time between his home and the European nation. At age 12, he was invited to an eight-week trial with the West Ham United U18 team. During his first week with the club, Hadeed scored from outside the 18-yard box against Arsenal. Afterward, the club looked to sign the player immediately. Upon signing, he became the first young player from Antigua to sign for an England-based club in over a decade. Hadeed would return to Antigua during the summer break to train with youth national team head coach Desmond Bleau.

By 2023, Hadeed had left West Ham United and joined the MLS Next team of the Columbus Crew of Major League Soccer. During his first season with the team, he made thirteen combined appearances with the under-15 and under-17 sides, scoring one goal. He also returned to training with North Coast United that summer.

In October 2023, it was announced that Hadeed had signed for Carolina Core FC of MLS Next Pro, along with Aryeh Miller, for the 2024 season. The deal made the players the first-ever signings for the new club. The deal was Hadeed's first professional contract. On 21 March 2024, in his second-ever professional appearance and first-ever start, Hadeed scored his first professional goal in a 2024 U.S. Open Cup victory over NoVa FC of the USL League Two. The 16-year-old's goal was the club's first-ever in the competition, scored eighteen minutes into the match.

In March 2026, Hadeed returned to Europe by signing for Antequera CF in the Spanish Primera Federación.

== International career ==
In summer 2022, Hadeed was included in Antigua and Barbuda's U20 squad for the 2022 CONCACAF U-20 Championship. He made his debut in the team's second match, an eventual 0–3 defeat to Costa Rica, coming on as a 75th-minute substitute. At age fourteen, he was the youngest player to compete in the tournament.

Hadeed was called up to the senior national team for the first time in September 2023 for 2023–24 CONCACAF Nations League B matches against Guyana and Puerto Rico at age 15.

== Personal life ==
Hadeed's paternal grandparents were Syrians who emigrated to Antigua and Barbuda. His maternal grandparents were Cubans who emigrated to the United States. Hadeed split his childhood between the United States and Antigua and Barbuda.
