= Ibrahim Covi =

French footballer (born 2000)

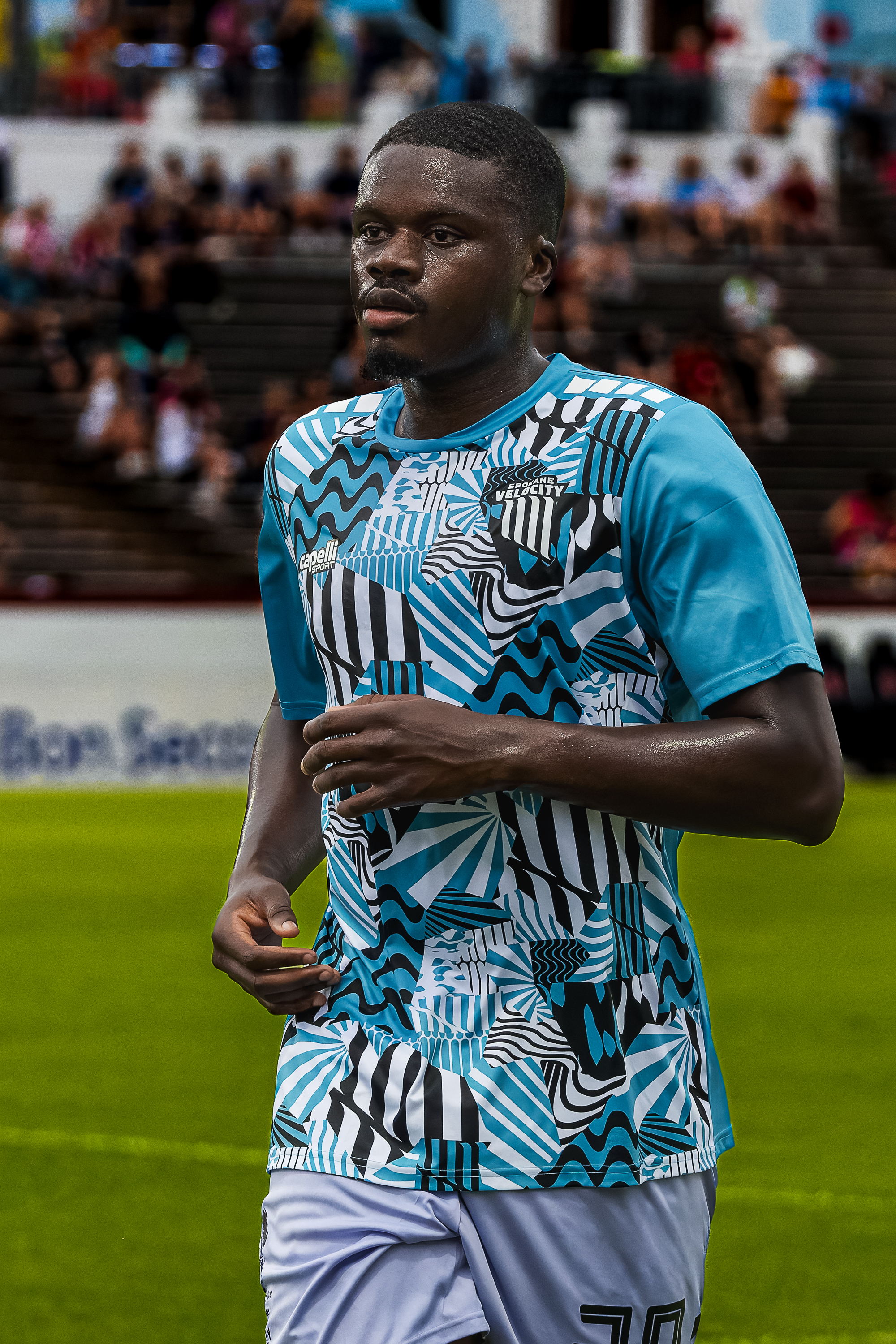
- Covi with Spokane Velocity in 2026

Personal information
- Full name: Ibrahim Janis Covi
- Date of birth: 21 March 2000 (age 26)
- Place of birth: Paris, France
- Position: Centre back

Team information
- Current team: Spokane Velocity
- Number: 20

Youth career
- 2009–2015: Paris FC
- 2015–2017: Aubervilliers
- 2017–2021: Metz

Senior career*
Years	Team	Apps	(Gls)
2021–2023	Ponferradina B	54	(2)
2022–2023	Ponferradina	1	(0)
2024–2025	Carolina Core	49	(3)
2026–	Spokane Velocity	16	(1)
- * Club domestic league appearances and goals as of 09:23, 3 November 2026 (UTC)

Ibrahim Janis Covi (born 21 March 2000) is a French footballer who plays for USL League One club Spokane Velocity. Mainly a central defender, he can also play as a defensive midfielder.

== Club career ==
In March 2017, Covi agreed to move from FCM Aubervilliers to FC Metz, with the deal being effective at the end of the season. In 2021, after finishing his formation, he moved to Spain and joined SD Ponferradina, being assigned to the reserves in Primera Regional.

In July 2022, after helping the B-side in their promotion to Tercera Federación, Covi renewed his contract with Ponfe for a further year. He made his first team debut on 12 November, starting in a 2–1 away loss against CD Guadalajara, for the season's Copa del Rey.

Covi made his professional debut on 19 November 2022, coming on as a half-time substitute for Adrián Diéguez in a 1–1 Segunda División home draw against Real Oviedo.

Covi signed with MLS Next Pro expansion club Carolina Core in December 2023.
