= David Polanco =

Colombian footballer

Personal information
- Date of birth: 9 February 1999 (age 27)
- Place of birth: Key Biscayne, United States
- Height: 6 ft 0 in (1.83 m)
- Position: Forward

Team information
- Current team: Dordoi Bishkek
- Number: 99

Youth career
- 2017–2018: Viitorul Constanța

College career
Years	Team	Apps	(Gls)
2020–2024	Barry Buccaneers	42	(25)

Senior career*
Years	Team	Apps	(Gls)
2017–2018	TSV Essingen	2	(0)
2018–2020	Deportes Quindío	0	(0)
2024–2026	Carolina Core	36	(8)
2026	Talant	10	(4)
2026–	Dordoi Bishkek	10	(7)
- * Club domestic league appearances and goals as of 14:11, 15 October 2026 (UTC)

David "Pachittoo" Polanco (born 9 February 1999) is an Colombian professional footballer who currently plays for FC Dordoi Bishkek of the Kyrgyz Higher League.

== Club career ==
Polanco began playing in the local Key Biscayne youth soccer program. At the under-9 level, his team went undefeated and won the Disney Cup International Youth Soccer Tournament. When he was eighteen, he moved to Europe to play for the reserve team of Viitorul Constanța in Romania. He then joined TSV Essingen of Germany's Verbandsliga Württemberg. Following his time in Germany, Polanco joined the academy of Deportes Quindío of Colombia's Categoría Primera B. In 2020, he returned to the United States to play college soccer for the Buccaneers of Barry University. He remained with the team until he graduated in 2024. During his time with the Buccaneers, Polanco won numerous individual awards including being named the 2023 Sunshine State Conference Offensive Player of the Year, SSC Tournament MVP, and South Region Player of the Year.

After graduation in 2024, Polanco joined Carolina Core FC of the MLS Next Pro for the club's inaugural season. On 17 March 2024, he scored the team's first-ever goal in its debut match, a victory over Crown Legacy FC. The following summer, he was linked to PSIS Semarang of the Indonesian Championship and Sabail FK of the Azerbaijan First League. However, he remained with Core FC until 2026. Following his time with the club, Polanco was again contacted by an agent about playing overseas. In spring 2026, he moved to FC Talant of the Kyrgyz Higher League ahead of the 2026 season. His early standout performances included a goal against FC Dordoi Bishkek in April as he quickly became one of the higher-scoring foreign players in the league. By July of that year, Polanco had moved to league rivals Dordoi Bishkek where he continued his scoring form.

== International career ==
In August 2012, Polanco was one of fifty players invited to a talent identification and training camp by the United States Soccer Federation for the United States national under-15 team while a member of Kendall SC.
