= Yekeson Subah =

American soccer player

Personal information
- Full name: Yekeson Subah
- Date of birth: February 13, 2004 (age 22)
- Place of birth: Raleigh, North Carolina, United States
- Height: 5 ft 11 in (1.80 m)
- Position: Forward

Youth career
- 2016–2021: North Carolina FC
- 2021: Real Salt Lake

Senior career*
Years	Team	Apps	(Gls)
2021	North Carolina FC U23	6	(0)
2021	North Carolina FC	2	(0)
2021–2022	Real Monarchs	18	(0)
2023	Los Angeles FC 2	21	(3)
2023	Los Angeles FC	1	(0)
2024–2025	Carolina Core FC	13	(0)
- * Club domestic league appearances and goals as of June 24, 2024

Yekeson Subah (born February 13, 2004) is an American soccer player who plays as a forward.

== Club career ==
Subah joined the North Carolina FC academy in 2016, where he played before signing an academy contract with the club's USL League One side for the 2021 season.

He made his debut on May 22, 2021, appearing as an 81st-minute substitute in a 0–0 draw with Richmond Kickers.

In June 2021, Subah left North Carolina to join the Real Salt Lake academy. On September 15, 2021, Subah signed a professional deal with Salt Lake's USL Championship side Real Monarchs.

== Personal life ==
Born in the United States, Subah is of Liberian descent.

== Career statistics ==
As of match played August 1, 2021

Appearances and goals by club, season and competition
Club	Season	League			National Cup		Continental		Total	
Club	Season	Division	Apps	Goals	Apps	Goals	Apps	Goals	Apps	Goals
North Carolina FC	2021	USL League One	2	0	0	0	—		2	0
Career total			2	0	0	0	0	0	2	0
